

412001–412100 

|-bgcolor=#d6d6d6
| 412001 ||  || — || October 14, 2009 || Mount Lemmon || Mount Lemmon Survey || URS || align=right | 3.5 km || 
|-id=002 bgcolor=#d6d6d6
| 412002 ||  || — || September 18, 2009 || Kitt Peak || Spacewatch || — || align=right | 2.6 km || 
|-id=003 bgcolor=#d6d6d6
| 412003 ||  || — || November 16, 2009 || Mount Lemmon || Mount Lemmon Survey || EOS || align=right | 2.2 km || 
|-id=004 bgcolor=#d6d6d6
| 412004 ||  || — || March 26, 2006 || Kitt Peak || Spacewatch || — || align=right | 3.5 km || 
|-id=005 bgcolor=#d6d6d6
| 412005 ||  || — || January 30, 2006 || Kitt Peak || Spacewatch || — || align=right | 3.7 km || 
|-id=006 bgcolor=#d6d6d6
| 412006 || 2012 MU || — || March 26, 2010 || WISE || WISE || — || align=right | 4.1 km || 
|-id=007 bgcolor=#d6d6d6
| 412007 ||  || — || April 19, 2006 || Catalina || CSS || — || align=right | 4.5 km || 
|-id=008 bgcolor=#fefefe
| 412008 ||  || — || January 7, 2006 || Mount Lemmon || Mount Lemmon Survey || H || align=right data-sort-value="0.91" | 910 m || 
|-id=009 bgcolor=#fefefe
| 412009 ||  || — || October 12, 2007 || Catalina || CSS || H || align=right data-sort-value="0.73" | 730 m || 
|-id=010 bgcolor=#E9E9E9
| 412010 ||  || — || October 13, 2007 || Catalina || CSS || — || align=right | 3.1 km || 
|-id=011 bgcolor=#E9E9E9
| 412011 ||  || — || January 15, 2005 || Kitt Peak || Spacewatch || — || align=right | 1.5 km || 
|-id=012 bgcolor=#E9E9E9
| 412012 ||  || — || September 10, 2007 || Kitt Peak || Spacewatch || DOR || align=right | 2.9 km || 
|-id=013 bgcolor=#fefefe
| 412013 ||  || — || February 14, 2008 || Catalina || CSS || H || align=right data-sort-value="0.85" | 850 m || 
|-id=014 bgcolor=#d6d6d6
| 412014 ||  || — || November 17, 2006 || Kitt Peak || Spacewatch || EOS || align=right | 2.6 km || 
|-id=015 bgcolor=#fefefe
| 412015 ||  || — || September 10, 2001 || Socorro || LINEAR || H || align=right data-sort-value="0.90" | 900 m || 
|-id=016 bgcolor=#d6d6d6
| 412016 ||  || — || December 18, 2007 || Mount Lemmon || Mount Lemmon Survey || EOS || align=right | 2.1 km || 
|-id=017 bgcolor=#d6d6d6
| 412017 ||  || — || April 24, 2003 || Kitt Peak || Spacewatch || — || align=right | 3.2 km || 
|-id=018 bgcolor=#fefefe
| 412018 ||  || — || February 2, 2000 || Socorro || LINEAR || H || align=right data-sort-value="0.85" | 850 m || 
|-id=019 bgcolor=#fefefe
| 412019 ||  || — || December 25, 2005 || Mount Lemmon || Mount Lemmon Survey || — || align=right | 1.0 km || 
|-id=020 bgcolor=#E9E9E9
| 412020 ||  || — || March 8, 2009 || Mount Lemmon || Mount Lemmon Survey || — || align=right | 2.9 km || 
|-id=021 bgcolor=#fefefe
| 412021 ||  || — || January 23, 2006 || Kitt Peak || Spacewatch || — || align=right data-sort-value="0.77" | 770 m || 
|-id=022 bgcolor=#fefefe
| 412022 ||  || — || February 27, 2008 || Mount Lemmon || Mount Lemmon Survey || H || align=right data-sort-value="0.52" | 520 m || 
|-id=023 bgcolor=#E9E9E9
| 412023 ||  || — || January 28, 2009 || Catalina || CSS || HNS || align=right | 1.3 km || 
|-id=024 bgcolor=#fefefe
| 412024 ||  || — || March 31, 2008 || Catalina || CSS || H || align=right data-sort-value="0.56" | 560 m || 
|-id=025 bgcolor=#fefefe
| 412025 ||  || — || January 7, 2006 || Kitt Peak || Spacewatch || — || align=right data-sort-value="0.79" | 790 m || 
|-id=026 bgcolor=#E9E9E9
| 412026 ||  || — || October 28, 2008 || Mount Lemmon || Mount Lemmon Survey || — || align=right | 1.6 km || 
|-id=027 bgcolor=#fefefe
| 412027 ||  || — || January 31, 2006 || Mount Lemmon || Mount Lemmon Survey || — || align=right data-sort-value="0.71" | 710 m || 
|-id=028 bgcolor=#fefefe
| 412028 ||  || — || January 5, 2000 || Kitt Peak || Spacewatch || H || align=right data-sort-value="0.78" | 780 m || 
|-id=029 bgcolor=#fefefe
| 412029 ||  || — || February 5, 2013 || Kitt Peak || Spacewatch || — || align=right data-sort-value="0.72" | 720 m || 
|-id=030 bgcolor=#fefefe
| 412030 ||  || — || April 7, 2006 || Anderson Mesa || LONEOS || — || align=right data-sort-value="0.89" | 890 m || 
|-id=031 bgcolor=#fefefe
| 412031 ||  || — || October 26, 2008 || Kitt Peak || Spacewatch || — || align=right data-sort-value="0.80" | 800 m || 
|-id=032 bgcolor=#fefefe
| 412032 ||  || — || January 27, 2010 || WISE || WISE || — || align=right | 2.2 km || 
|-id=033 bgcolor=#fefefe
| 412033 ||  || — || October 7, 2008 || Mount Lemmon || Mount Lemmon Survey || — || align=right data-sort-value="0.73" | 730 m || 
|-id=034 bgcolor=#fefefe
| 412034 ||  || — || April 12, 1994 || Kitt Peak || Spacewatch || — || align=right data-sort-value="0.54" | 540 m || 
|-id=035 bgcolor=#fefefe
| 412035 ||  || — || October 20, 2011 || Mount Lemmon || Mount Lemmon Survey || — || align=right data-sort-value="0.59" | 590 m || 
|-id=036 bgcolor=#fefefe
| 412036 ||  || — || March 23, 2006 || Mount Lemmon || Mount Lemmon Survey || — || align=right data-sort-value="0.67" | 670 m || 
|-id=037 bgcolor=#fefefe
| 412037 ||  || — || March 18, 2010 || Kitt Peak || Spacewatch || — || align=right data-sort-value="0.82" | 820 m || 
|-id=038 bgcolor=#fefefe
| 412038 ||  || — || November 24, 2011 || Mount Lemmon || Mount Lemmon Survey || — || align=right data-sort-value="0.98" | 980 m || 
|-id=039 bgcolor=#fefefe
| 412039 ||  || — || October 1, 2008 || Kitt Peak || Spacewatch || — || align=right data-sort-value="0.57" | 570 m || 
|-id=040 bgcolor=#fefefe
| 412040 ||  || — || October 24, 2011 || Mount Lemmon || Mount Lemmon Survey || — || align=right data-sort-value="0.88" | 880 m || 
|-id=041 bgcolor=#fefefe
| 412041 ||  || — || October 9, 2007 || Mount Lemmon || Mount Lemmon Survey || — || align=right | 1.00 km || 
|-id=042 bgcolor=#fefefe
| 412042 ||  || — || February 27, 2006 || Kitt Peak || Spacewatch || MAS || align=right data-sort-value="0.65" | 650 m || 
|-id=043 bgcolor=#fefefe
| 412043 ||  || — || April 8, 2010 || Kitt Peak || Spacewatch || — || align=right data-sort-value="0.68" | 680 m || 
|-id=044 bgcolor=#fefefe
| 412044 ||  || — || June 14, 2010 || Mount Lemmon || Mount Lemmon Survey || — || align=right | 1.0 km || 
|-id=045 bgcolor=#fefefe
| 412045 ||  || — || March 23, 2003 || Kitt Peak || Spacewatch || — || align=right data-sort-value="0.71" | 710 m || 
|-id=046 bgcolor=#fefefe
| 412046 ||  || — || March 25, 2010 || Kitt Peak || Spacewatch || — || align=right data-sort-value="0.67" | 670 m || 
|-id=047 bgcolor=#fefefe
| 412047 ||  || — || January 14, 2010 || Kitt Peak || Spacewatch || H || align=right data-sort-value="0.56" | 560 m || 
|-id=048 bgcolor=#fefefe
| 412048 ||  || — || April 10, 2010 || Mount Lemmon || Mount Lemmon Survey || — || align=right data-sort-value="0.78" | 780 m || 
|-id=049 bgcolor=#fefefe
| 412049 ||  || — || January 26, 2006 || Mount Lemmon || Mount Lemmon Survey || — || align=right data-sort-value="0.58" | 580 m || 
|-id=050 bgcolor=#E9E9E9
| 412050 ||  || — || June 2, 2005 || Catalina || CSS || — || align=right | 1.3 km || 
|-id=051 bgcolor=#fefefe
| 412051 ||  || — || October 9, 2007 || Socorro || LINEAR || V || align=right data-sort-value="0.79" | 790 m || 
|-id=052 bgcolor=#fefefe
| 412052 ||  || — || October 12, 2007 || Kitt Peak || Spacewatch || NYS || align=right data-sort-value="0.68" | 680 m || 
|-id=053 bgcolor=#fefefe
| 412053 ||  || — || November 1, 2005 || Mount Lemmon || Mount Lemmon Survey || — || align=right data-sort-value="0.48" | 480 m || 
|-id=054 bgcolor=#fefefe
| 412054 ||  || — || February 1, 2005 || Kitt Peak || Spacewatch || H || align=right data-sort-value="0.67" | 670 m || 
|-id=055 bgcolor=#fefefe
| 412055 ||  || — || December 31, 2008 || Kitt Peak || Spacewatch || — || align=right data-sort-value="0.85" | 850 m || 
|-id=056 bgcolor=#fefefe
| 412056 ||  || — || February 20, 2006 || Kitt Peak || Spacewatch || — || align=right data-sort-value="0.86" | 860 m || 
|-id=057 bgcolor=#fefefe
| 412057 ||  || — || September 28, 2003 || Kitt Peak || Spacewatch || — || align=right data-sort-value="0.92" | 920 m || 
|-id=058 bgcolor=#fefefe
| 412058 ||  || — || November 19, 2004 || Kitt Peak || Spacewatch || V || align=right data-sort-value="0.71" | 710 m || 
|-id=059 bgcolor=#fefefe
| 412059 ||  || — || February 25, 2006 || Kitt Peak || Spacewatch || — || align=right | 1.0 km || 
|-id=060 bgcolor=#fefefe
| 412060 ||  || — || March 25, 2000 || Kitt Peak || Spacewatch || — || align=right data-sort-value="0.64" | 640 m || 
|-id=061 bgcolor=#fefefe
| 412061 ||  || — || February 2, 2006 || Mount Lemmon || Mount Lemmon Survey || — || align=right data-sort-value="0.77" | 770 m || 
|-id=062 bgcolor=#fefefe
| 412062 ||  || — || May 6, 2006 || Mount Lemmon || Mount Lemmon Survey || — || align=right data-sort-value="0.76" | 760 m || 
|-id=063 bgcolor=#fefefe
| 412063 ||  || — || March 21, 2010 || Mount Lemmon || Mount Lemmon Survey || — || align=right data-sort-value="0.58" | 580 m || 
|-id=064 bgcolor=#fefefe
| 412064 ||  || — || September 28, 2011 || Mount Lemmon || Mount Lemmon Survey || — || align=right data-sort-value="0.75" | 750 m || 
|-id=065 bgcolor=#fefefe
| 412065 ||  || — || January 8, 2006 || Mount Lemmon || Mount Lemmon Survey || — || align=right data-sort-value="0.79" | 790 m || 
|-id=066 bgcolor=#fefefe
| 412066 ||  || — || October 22, 2011 || Kitt Peak || Spacewatch || — || align=right | 1.1 km || 
|-id=067 bgcolor=#fefefe
| 412067 ||  || — || May 7, 2010 || WISE || WISE || — || align=right | 2.2 km || 
|-id=068 bgcolor=#fefefe
| 412068 ||  || — || March 25, 2006 || Kitt Peak || Spacewatch || — || align=right data-sort-value="0.81" | 810 m || 
|-id=069 bgcolor=#fefefe
| 412069 ||  || — || January 16, 2009 || Kitt Peak || Spacewatch || NYS || align=right data-sort-value="0.56" | 560 m || 
|-id=070 bgcolor=#fefefe
| 412070 ||  || — || October 16, 2007 || Mount Lemmon || Mount Lemmon Survey || — || align=right data-sort-value="0.92" | 920 m || 
|-id=071 bgcolor=#fefefe
| 412071 ||  || — || January 22, 2006 || Mount Lemmon || Mount Lemmon Survey || — || align=right data-sort-value="0.80" | 800 m || 
|-id=072 bgcolor=#fefefe
| 412072 ||  || — || November 3, 2007 || Kitt Peak || Spacewatch || — || align=right data-sort-value="0.90" | 900 m || 
|-id=073 bgcolor=#fefefe
| 412073 ||  || — || April 20, 2006 || Catalina || CSS || NYS || align=right data-sort-value="0.75" | 750 m || 
|-id=074 bgcolor=#fefefe
| 412074 ||  || — || March 5, 2006 || Kitt Peak || Spacewatch || — || align=right data-sort-value="0.85" | 850 m || 
|-id=075 bgcolor=#fefefe
| 412075 ||  || — || May 29, 2000 || Prescott || P. G. Comba || — || align=right | 2.0 km || 
|-id=076 bgcolor=#fefefe
| 412076 ||  || — || April 5, 2000 || Socorro || LINEAR || — || align=right data-sort-value="0.76" | 760 m || 
|-id=077 bgcolor=#fefefe
| 412077 ||  || — || March 5, 2002 || Kitt Peak || Spacewatch || — || align=right data-sort-value="0.71" | 710 m || 
|-id=078 bgcolor=#fefefe
| 412078 ||  || — || April 4, 2010 || Kitt Peak || Spacewatch || — || align=right data-sort-value="0.67" | 670 m || 
|-id=079 bgcolor=#fefefe
| 412079 ||  || — || February 7, 2006 || Mount Lemmon || Mount Lemmon Survey || — || align=right | 1.2 km || 
|-id=080 bgcolor=#fefefe
| 412080 ||  || — || January 2, 2009 || Mount Lemmon || Mount Lemmon Survey || — || align=right | 2.4 km || 
|-id=081 bgcolor=#fefefe
| 412081 ||  || — || September 24, 1995 || Kitt Peak || Spacewatch || H || align=right data-sort-value="0.66" | 660 m || 
|-id=082 bgcolor=#fefefe
| 412082 ||  || — || September 12, 2007 || Catalina || CSS || — || align=right | 1.1 km || 
|-id=083 bgcolor=#E9E9E9
| 412083 ||  || — || October 23, 2006 || Mount Lemmon || Mount Lemmon Survey || — || align=right | 2.5 km || 
|-id=084 bgcolor=#fefefe
| 412084 ||  || — || October 25, 2008 || Kitt Peak || Spacewatch || — || align=right data-sort-value="0.55" | 550 m || 
|-id=085 bgcolor=#fefefe
| 412085 ||  || — || April 7, 2006 || Kitt Peak || Spacewatch || NYS || align=right data-sort-value="0.59" | 590 m || 
|-id=086 bgcolor=#fefefe
| 412086 ||  || — || November 2, 2000 || Socorro || LINEAR || H || align=right data-sort-value="0.68" | 680 m || 
|-id=087 bgcolor=#fefefe
| 412087 ||  || — || May 8, 2006 || Mount Lemmon || Mount Lemmon Survey || V || align=right data-sort-value="0.68" | 680 m || 
|-id=088 bgcolor=#fefefe
| 412088 ||  || — || September 28, 2011 || Mount Lemmon || Mount Lemmon Survey || — || align=right data-sort-value="0.65" | 650 m || 
|-id=089 bgcolor=#E9E9E9
| 412089 ||  || — || March 31, 2013 || Mount Lemmon || Mount Lemmon Survey || — || align=right | 1.5 km || 
|-id=090 bgcolor=#fefefe
| 412090 ||  || — || March 23, 2006 || Mount Lemmon || Mount Lemmon Survey || — || align=right data-sort-value="0.67" | 670 m || 
|-id=091 bgcolor=#fefefe
| 412091 ||  || — || November 7, 2007 || Kitt Peak || Spacewatch || — || align=right data-sort-value="0.86" | 860 m || 
|-id=092 bgcolor=#fefefe
| 412092 ||  || — || March 25, 2006 || Kitt Peak || Spacewatch || V || align=right data-sort-value="0.57" | 570 m || 
|-id=093 bgcolor=#fefefe
| 412093 ||  || — || January 15, 2009 || Kitt Peak || Spacewatch || MAS || align=right data-sort-value="0.72" | 720 m || 
|-id=094 bgcolor=#fefefe
| 412094 ||  || — || April 29, 2006 || Kitt Peak || Spacewatch || V || align=right data-sort-value="0.54" | 540 m || 
|-id=095 bgcolor=#fefefe
| 412095 ||  || — || March 2, 2006 || Kitt Peak || Spacewatch || — || align=right data-sort-value="0.86" | 860 m || 
|-id=096 bgcolor=#E9E9E9
| 412096 ||  || — || April 26, 2000 || Kitt Peak || Spacewatch || — || align=right | 1.6 km || 
|-id=097 bgcolor=#fefefe
| 412097 ||  || — || March 25, 2006 || Kitt Peak || Spacewatch || — || align=right data-sort-value="0.69" | 690 m || 
|-id=098 bgcolor=#fefefe
| 412098 ||  || — || October 15, 2001 || Kitt Peak || Spacewatch || — || align=right data-sort-value="0.80" | 800 m || 
|-id=099 bgcolor=#fefefe
| 412099 ||  || — || February 28, 2009 || Kitt Peak || Spacewatch || MAS || align=right data-sort-value="0.65" | 650 m || 
|-id=100 bgcolor=#fefefe
| 412100 ||  || — || February 10, 2002 || Socorro || LINEAR || — || align=right data-sort-value="0.85" | 850 m || 
|}

412101–412200 

|-bgcolor=#E9E9E9
| 412101 ||  || — || November 12, 2010 || Mount Lemmon || Mount Lemmon Survey || BAR || align=right | 1.5 km || 
|-id=102 bgcolor=#E9E9E9
| 412102 ||  || — || October 19, 2006 || Kitt Peak || Spacewatch || — || align=right | 1.2 km || 
|-id=103 bgcolor=#E9E9E9
| 412103 ||  || — || October 9, 2010 || Mount Lemmon || Mount Lemmon Survey || BRG || align=right | 1.3 km || 
|-id=104 bgcolor=#fefefe
| 412104 ||  || — || January 31, 2009 || Kitt Peak || Spacewatch || — || align=right data-sort-value="0.72" | 720 m || 
|-id=105 bgcolor=#E9E9E9
| 412105 ||  || — || October 30, 2011 || Mount Lemmon || Mount Lemmon Survey || — || align=right data-sort-value="0.79" | 790 m || 
|-id=106 bgcolor=#E9E9E9
| 412106 ||  || — || March 23, 2009 || XuYi || PMO NEO || BAR || align=right | 1.2 km || 
|-id=107 bgcolor=#fefefe
| 412107 ||  || — || October 13, 1999 || Kitt Peak || Spacewatch || MAS || align=right data-sort-value="0.77" | 770 m || 
|-id=108 bgcolor=#fefefe
| 412108 ||  || — || April 22, 1998 || Kitt Peak || Spacewatch || — || align=right data-sort-value="0.79" | 790 m || 
|-id=109 bgcolor=#fefefe
| 412109 ||  || — || March 24, 2006 || Kitt Peak || Spacewatch || V || align=right data-sort-value="0.54" | 540 m || 
|-id=110 bgcolor=#fefefe
| 412110 ||  || — || October 6, 2004 || Kitt Peak || Spacewatch || — || align=right data-sort-value="0.82" | 820 m || 
|-id=111 bgcolor=#fefefe
| 412111 ||  || — || May 3, 2006 || Mount Lemmon || Mount Lemmon Survey || MAS || align=right data-sort-value="0.79" | 790 m || 
|-id=112 bgcolor=#fefefe
| 412112 ||  || — || April 8, 2006 || Kitt Peak || Spacewatch || NYS || align=right data-sort-value="0.63" | 630 m || 
|-id=113 bgcolor=#d6d6d6
| 412113 ||  || — || October 30, 2010 || Mount Lemmon || Mount Lemmon Survey || — || align=right | 3.4 km || 
|-id=114 bgcolor=#fefefe
| 412114 ||  || — || February 9, 2002 || Kitt Peak || Spacewatch || — || align=right data-sort-value="0.79" | 790 m || 
|-id=115 bgcolor=#E9E9E9
| 412115 ||  || — || February 10, 2008 || Mount Lemmon || Mount Lemmon Survey || — || align=right | 2.0 km || 
|-id=116 bgcolor=#fefefe
| 412116 ||  || — || February 9, 2005 || Mount Lemmon || Mount Lemmon Survey || — || align=right data-sort-value="0.72" | 720 m || 
|-id=117 bgcolor=#fefefe
| 412117 ||  || — || April 2, 2006 || Kitt Peak || Spacewatch || — || align=right data-sort-value="0.82" | 820 m || 
|-id=118 bgcolor=#E9E9E9
| 412118 ||  || — || December 16, 2006 || Kitt Peak || Spacewatch || EUN || align=right | 1.4 km || 
|-id=119 bgcolor=#fefefe
| 412119 ||  || — || May 20, 2010 || WISE || WISE || — || align=right | 3.4 km || 
|-id=120 bgcolor=#E9E9E9
| 412120 ||  || — || April 17, 2009 || Mount Lemmon || Mount Lemmon Survey || EUN || align=right | 1.7 km || 
|-id=121 bgcolor=#fefefe
| 412121 ||  || — || April 8, 2002 || Kitt Peak || Spacewatch || — || align=right data-sort-value="0.84" | 840 m || 
|-id=122 bgcolor=#d6d6d6
| 412122 ||  || — || March 31, 2013 || Mount Lemmon || Mount Lemmon Survey || — || align=right | 2.7 km || 
|-id=123 bgcolor=#fefefe
| 412123 ||  || — || March 29, 2000 || Kitt Peak || Spacewatch || — || align=right data-sort-value="0.58" | 580 m || 
|-id=124 bgcolor=#fefefe
| 412124 ||  || — || March 13, 2013 || Catalina || CSS || — || align=right | 1.2 km || 
|-id=125 bgcolor=#fefefe
| 412125 ||  || — || January 2, 2009 || Kitt Peak || Spacewatch || — || align=right | 1.2 km || 
|-id=126 bgcolor=#fefefe
| 412126 ||  || — || April 30, 2006 || Catalina || CSS || — || align=right data-sort-value="0.87" | 870 m || 
|-id=127 bgcolor=#E9E9E9
| 412127 ||  || — || March 21, 2009 || Kitt Peak || Spacewatch || — || align=right | 1.1 km || 
|-id=128 bgcolor=#d6d6d6
| 412128 ||  || — || September 19, 1995 || Kitt Peak || Spacewatch || — || align=right | 2.0 km || 
|-id=129 bgcolor=#fefefe
| 412129 ||  || — || April 2, 2005 || Kitt Peak || Spacewatch || H || align=right data-sort-value="0.77" | 770 m || 
|-id=130 bgcolor=#fefefe
| 412130 ||  || — || December 2, 2004 || Socorro || LINEAR || (2076) || align=right | 1.0 km || 
|-id=131 bgcolor=#fefefe
| 412131 ||  || — || May 7, 2006 || Mount Lemmon || Mount Lemmon Survey || MAS || align=right data-sort-value="0.78" | 780 m || 
|-id=132 bgcolor=#E9E9E9
| 412132 ||  || — || May 13, 2009 || Kitt Peak || Spacewatch || — || align=right | 1.2 km || 
|-id=133 bgcolor=#fefefe
| 412133 ||  || — || November 18, 2011 || Mount Lemmon || Mount Lemmon Survey || — || align=right data-sort-value="0.71" | 710 m || 
|-id=134 bgcolor=#fefefe
| 412134 ||  || — || March 16, 2002 || Socorro || LINEAR || — || align=right data-sort-value="0.76" | 760 m || 
|-id=135 bgcolor=#fefefe
| 412135 ||  || — || October 21, 2003 || Kitt Peak || Spacewatch || — || align=right data-sort-value="0.91" | 910 m || 
|-id=136 bgcolor=#fefefe
| 412136 ||  || — || September 10, 2007 || Kitt Peak || Spacewatch || V || align=right data-sort-value="0.80" | 800 m || 
|-id=137 bgcolor=#E9E9E9
| 412137 ||  || — || April 26, 2009 || Siding Spring || SSS || — || align=right | 2.6 km || 
|-id=138 bgcolor=#fefefe
| 412138 ||  || — || September 25, 2006 || Catalina || CSS || — || align=right | 1.1 km || 
|-id=139 bgcolor=#fefefe
| 412139 ||  || — || December 29, 2011 || Mount Lemmon || Mount Lemmon Survey || — || align=right | 1.0 km || 
|-id=140 bgcolor=#fefefe
| 412140 ||  || — || February 16, 2001 || Kitt Peak || Spacewatch || — || align=right data-sort-value="0.96" | 960 m || 
|-id=141 bgcolor=#E9E9E9
| 412141 ||  || — || September 26, 2006 || Mount Lemmon || Mount Lemmon Survey || — || align=right data-sort-value="0.86" | 860 m || 
|-id=142 bgcolor=#fefefe
| 412142 ||  || — || September 24, 2000 || Socorro || LINEAR || H || align=right data-sort-value="0.90" | 900 m || 
|-id=143 bgcolor=#E9E9E9
| 412143 ||  || — || October 3, 2006 || Mount Lemmon || Mount Lemmon Survey || — || align=right | 1.0 km || 
|-id=144 bgcolor=#E9E9E9
| 412144 ||  || — || January 16, 2008 || Kitt Peak || Spacewatch || — || align=right | 2.4 km || 
|-id=145 bgcolor=#E9E9E9
| 412145 ||  || — || December 13, 1999 || Kitt Peak || Spacewatch || — || align=right | 1.2 km || 
|-id=146 bgcolor=#d6d6d6
| 412146 ||  || — || May 7, 2008 || Mount Lemmon || Mount Lemmon Survey || — || align=right | 2.4 km || 
|-id=147 bgcolor=#fefefe
| 412147 ||  || — || December 5, 2007 || Kitt Peak || Spacewatch || — || align=right | 1.1 km || 
|-id=148 bgcolor=#d6d6d6
| 412148 ||  || — || March 12, 2007 || Kitt Peak || Spacewatch || — || align=right | 3.1 km || 
|-id=149 bgcolor=#fefefe
| 412149 ||  || — || December 19, 2004 || Mount Lemmon || Mount Lemmon Survey || — || align=right data-sort-value="0.69" | 690 m || 
|-id=150 bgcolor=#fefefe
| 412150 ||  || — || April 12, 2002 || Socorro || LINEAR || ERI || align=right | 1.5 km || 
|-id=151 bgcolor=#E9E9E9
| 412151 ||  || — || February 7, 2008 || Catalina || CSS || — || align=right | 1.7 km || 
|-id=152 bgcolor=#E9E9E9
| 412152 ||  || — || September 27, 2006 || Kitt Peak || Spacewatch || — || align=right data-sort-value="0.82" | 820 m || 
|-id=153 bgcolor=#E9E9E9
| 412153 ||  || — || May 13, 2005 || Kitt Peak || Spacewatch || — || align=right data-sort-value="0.98" | 980 m || 
|-id=154 bgcolor=#fefefe
| 412154 ||  || — || March 23, 2006 || Catalina || CSS || — || align=right | 1.1 km || 
|-id=155 bgcolor=#fefefe
| 412155 ||  || — || September 20, 2003 || Kitt Peak || Spacewatch || — || align=right | 2.8 km || 
|-id=156 bgcolor=#fefefe
| 412156 ||  || — || March 14, 1999 || Kitt Peak || Spacewatch || — || align=right data-sort-value="0.85" | 850 m || 
|-id=157 bgcolor=#fefefe
| 412157 ||  || — || April 14, 2005 || Kitt Peak || Spacewatch || H || align=right data-sort-value="0.59" | 590 m || 
|-id=158 bgcolor=#E9E9E9
| 412158 ||  || — || October 2, 2006 || Kitt Peak || Spacewatch || — || align=right | 1.3 km || 
|-id=159 bgcolor=#fefefe
| 412159 ||  || — || January 3, 2009 || Mount Lemmon || Mount Lemmon Survey || — || align=right data-sort-value="0.74" | 740 m || 
|-id=160 bgcolor=#fefefe
| 412160 ||  || — || March 26, 2006 || Anderson Mesa || LONEOS || — || align=right data-sort-value="0.72" | 720 m || 
|-id=161 bgcolor=#fefefe
| 412161 ||  || — || January 31, 2006 || Mount Lemmon || Mount Lemmon Survey || NYS || align=right data-sort-value="0.79" | 790 m || 
|-id=162 bgcolor=#fefefe
| 412162 ||  || — || December 31, 2008 || Kitt Peak || Spacewatch || — || align=right data-sort-value="0.83" | 830 m || 
|-id=163 bgcolor=#fefefe
| 412163 ||  || — || March 24, 2006 || Mount Lemmon || Mount Lemmon Survey || — || align=right data-sort-value="0.70" | 700 m || 
|-id=164 bgcolor=#E9E9E9
| 412164 ||  || — || March 17, 2005 || Mount Lemmon || Mount Lemmon Survey || — || align=right data-sort-value="0.85" | 850 m || 
|-id=165 bgcolor=#E9E9E9
| 412165 ||  || — || March 6, 2008 || Mount Lemmon || Mount Lemmon Survey || DOR || align=right | 2.4 km || 
|-id=166 bgcolor=#fefefe
| 412166 ||  || — || February 28, 2006 || Catalina || CSS || — || align=right data-sort-value="0.95" | 950 m || 
|-id=167 bgcolor=#E9E9E9
| 412167 ||  || — || July 19, 2009 || Siding Spring || SSS || — || align=right | 2.6 km || 
|-id=168 bgcolor=#d6d6d6
| 412168 ||  || — || April 29, 2008 || Mount Lemmon || Mount Lemmon Survey || — || align=right | 2.5 km || 
|-id=169 bgcolor=#fefefe
| 412169 ||  || — || September 24, 1995 || Kitt Peak || Spacewatch || — || align=right | 2.8 km || 
|-id=170 bgcolor=#fefefe
| 412170 ||  || — || February 9, 2005 || Kitt Peak || Spacewatch || — || align=right | 1.0 km || 
|-id=171 bgcolor=#fefefe
| 412171 ||  || — || March 9, 1999 || Kitt Peak || Spacewatch || — || align=right | 2.1 km || 
|-id=172 bgcolor=#fefefe
| 412172 ||  || — || February 17, 2010 || Catalina || CSS || H || align=right data-sort-value="0.62" | 620 m || 
|-id=173 bgcolor=#E9E9E9
| 412173 ||  || — || September 17, 2010 || Mount Lemmon || Mount Lemmon Survey || — || align=right | 2.3 km || 
|-id=174 bgcolor=#fefefe
| 412174 ||  || — || April 8, 2002 || Kitt Peak || Spacewatch || — || align=right data-sort-value="0.94" | 940 m || 
|-id=175 bgcolor=#fefefe
| 412175 ||  || — || January 6, 2006 || Mount Lemmon || Mount Lemmon Survey || — || align=right data-sort-value="0.64" | 640 m || 
|-id=176 bgcolor=#fefefe
| 412176 ||  || — || April 4, 2005 || Catalina || CSS || H || align=right data-sort-value="0.77" | 770 m || 
|-id=177 bgcolor=#E9E9E9
| 412177 ||  || — || April 5, 2000 || Kitt Peak || Spacewatch || — || align=right | 1.2 km || 
|-id=178 bgcolor=#fefefe
| 412178 ||  || — || March 25, 2006 || Kitt Peak || Spacewatch || — || align=right data-sort-value="0.73" | 730 m || 
|-id=179 bgcolor=#fefefe
| 412179 ||  || — || October 7, 2004 || Kitt Peak || Spacewatch || — || align=right data-sort-value="0.73" | 730 m || 
|-id=180 bgcolor=#fefefe
| 412180 ||  || — || February 19, 2009 || Kitt Peak || Spacewatch || — || align=right | 1.00 km || 
|-id=181 bgcolor=#fefefe
| 412181 ||  || — || May 16, 2010 || WISE || WISE || — || align=right data-sort-value="0.92" | 920 m || 
|-id=182 bgcolor=#fefefe
| 412182 ||  || — || February 27, 2006 || Kitt Peak || Spacewatch || — || align=right | 1.4 km || 
|-id=183 bgcolor=#fefefe
| 412183 ||  || — || December 26, 2005 || Mount Lemmon || Mount Lemmon Survey || — || align=right data-sort-value="0.74" | 740 m || 
|-id=184 bgcolor=#E9E9E9
| 412184 ||  || — || September 25, 2006 || Kitt Peak || Spacewatch || — || align=right | 1.4 km || 
|-id=185 bgcolor=#fefefe
| 412185 ||  || — || October 2, 2003 || Kitt Peak || Spacewatch || H || align=right data-sort-value="0.56" | 560 m || 
|-id=186 bgcolor=#fefefe
| 412186 ||  || — || May 11, 2005 || Mount Lemmon || Mount Lemmon Survey || H || align=right data-sort-value="0.72" | 720 m || 
|-id=187 bgcolor=#E9E9E9
| 412187 ||  || — || September 24, 2006 || Kitt Peak || Spacewatch || — || align=right data-sort-value="0.90" | 900 m || 
|-id=188 bgcolor=#fefefe
| 412188 ||  || — || April 26, 2006 || Catalina || CSS || V || align=right data-sort-value="0.89" | 890 m || 
|-id=189 bgcolor=#fefefe
| 412189 ||  || — || September 14, 2007 || Catalina || CSS || — || align=right data-sort-value="0.89" | 890 m || 
|-id=190 bgcolor=#fefefe
| 412190 ||  || — || December 31, 2008 || Mount Lemmon || Mount Lemmon Survey || — || align=right data-sort-value="0.97" | 970 m || 
|-id=191 bgcolor=#fefefe
| 412191 ||  || — || October 12, 2007 || Mount Lemmon || Mount Lemmon Survey || — || align=right data-sort-value="0.99" | 990 m || 
|-id=192 bgcolor=#fefefe
| 412192 ||  || — || September 23, 2004 || Kitt Peak || Spacewatch || — || align=right data-sort-value="0.85" | 850 m || 
|-id=193 bgcolor=#E9E9E9
| 412193 ||  || — || February 10, 2008 || Kitt Peak || Spacewatch || — || align=right | 2.2 km || 
|-id=194 bgcolor=#d6d6d6
| 412194 ||  || — || November 12, 2010 || Kitt Peak || Spacewatch || EOS || align=right | 2.5 km || 
|-id=195 bgcolor=#fefefe
| 412195 ||  || — || September 11, 2010 || Catalina || CSS || — || align=right | 1.0 km || 
|-id=196 bgcolor=#fefefe
| 412196 ||  || — || November 17, 2011 || Kitt Peak || Spacewatch || V || align=right data-sort-value="0.74" | 740 m || 
|-id=197 bgcolor=#E9E9E9
| 412197 ||  || — || May 20, 2005 || Mount Lemmon || Mount Lemmon Survey || — || align=right | 1.0 km || 
|-id=198 bgcolor=#d6d6d6
| 412198 ||  || — || December 10, 2010 || Kitt Peak || Spacewatch || — || align=right | 3.8 km || 
|-id=199 bgcolor=#fefefe
| 412199 ||  || — || October 11, 2007 || Kitt Peak || Spacewatch || V || align=right data-sort-value="0.74" | 740 m || 
|-id=200 bgcolor=#fefefe
| 412200 ||  || — || February 4, 2005 || Kitt Peak || Spacewatch || — || align=right data-sort-value="0.71" | 710 m || 
|}

412201–412300 

|-bgcolor=#fefefe
| 412201 ||  || — || October 3, 2008 || Mount Lemmon || Mount Lemmon Survey || — || align=right data-sort-value="0.72" | 720 m || 
|-id=202 bgcolor=#fefefe
| 412202 ||  || — || April 9, 2006 || Mount Lemmon || Mount Lemmon Survey || — || align=right | 1.0 km || 
|-id=203 bgcolor=#fefefe
| 412203 ||  || — || February 4, 2005 || Mount Lemmon || Mount Lemmon Survey || NYS || align=right data-sort-value="0.69" | 690 m || 
|-id=204 bgcolor=#E9E9E9
| 412204 ||  || — || April 29, 2000 || Socorro || LINEAR || — || align=right | 1.6 km || 
|-id=205 bgcolor=#E9E9E9
| 412205 ||  || — || May 26, 2009 || Catalina || CSS || — || align=right | 1.2 km || 
|-id=206 bgcolor=#fefefe
| 412206 ||  || — || April 5, 2000 || Anderson Mesa || LONEOS || — || align=right data-sort-value="0.79" | 790 m || 
|-id=207 bgcolor=#E9E9E9
| 412207 ||  || — || April 27, 2009 || Mount Lemmon || Mount Lemmon Survey || — || align=right | 1.4 km || 
|-id=208 bgcolor=#fefefe
| 412208 ||  || — || October 8, 2007 || Mount Lemmon || Mount Lemmon Survey || — || align=right data-sort-value="0.84" | 840 m || 
|-id=209 bgcolor=#fefefe
| 412209 ||  || — || September 5, 2007 || Mount Lemmon || Mount Lemmon Survey || — || align=right | 1.00 km || 
|-id=210 bgcolor=#fefefe
| 412210 ||  || — || October 12, 2007 || Kitt Peak || Spacewatch || — || align=right data-sort-value="0.95" | 950 m || 
|-id=211 bgcolor=#E9E9E9
| 412211 ||  || — || January 19, 2004 || Kitt Peak || Spacewatch || — || align=right | 1.2 km || 
|-id=212 bgcolor=#E9E9E9
| 412212 ||  || — || March 15, 2004 || Kitt Peak || Spacewatch || — || align=right | 1.4 km || 
|-id=213 bgcolor=#fefefe
| 412213 ||  || — || December 22, 2008 || Mount Lemmon || Mount Lemmon Survey || — || align=right data-sort-value="0.73" | 730 m || 
|-id=214 bgcolor=#E9E9E9
| 412214 ||  || — || November 10, 2010 || Mount Lemmon || Mount Lemmon Survey || — || align=right | 2.0 km || 
|-id=215 bgcolor=#E9E9E9
| 412215 ||  || — || November 16, 2006 || Kitt Peak || Spacewatch || — || align=right | 1.5 km || 
|-id=216 bgcolor=#d6d6d6
| 412216 ||  || — || October 24, 2003 || Kitt Peak || Spacewatch || — || align=right | 3.8 km || 
|-id=217 bgcolor=#E9E9E9
| 412217 ||  || — || September 10, 2010 || Mount Lemmon || Mount Lemmon Survey || — || align=right | 1.1 km || 
|-id=218 bgcolor=#fefefe
| 412218 ||  || — || February 2, 2005 || Kitt Peak || Spacewatch || — || align=right data-sort-value="0.98" | 980 m || 
|-id=219 bgcolor=#fefefe
| 412219 ||  || — || May 18, 2010 || WISE || WISE || SUL || align=right | 2.1 km || 
|-id=220 bgcolor=#E9E9E9
| 412220 ||  || — || October 10, 2010 || Mount Lemmon || Mount Lemmon Survey || EUN || align=right | 1.4 km || 
|-id=221 bgcolor=#fefefe
| 412221 ||  || — || March 10, 2002 || Cima Ekar || ADAS || MAS || align=right data-sort-value="0.59" | 590 m || 
|-id=222 bgcolor=#d6d6d6
| 412222 ||  || — || January 4, 2012 || Mount Lemmon || Mount Lemmon Survey || — || align=right | 2.6 km || 
|-id=223 bgcolor=#fefefe
| 412223 ||  || — || March 19, 2009 || Mount Lemmon || Mount Lemmon Survey || NYS || align=right data-sort-value="0.65" | 650 m || 
|-id=224 bgcolor=#fefefe
| 412224 ||  || — || December 3, 2008 || Kitt Peak || Spacewatch || — || align=right data-sort-value="0.58" | 580 m || 
|-id=225 bgcolor=#E9E9E9
| 412225 ||  || — || October 2, 2006 || Mount Lemmon || Mount Lemmon Survey || — || align=right | 1.1 km || 
|-id=226 bgcolor=#fefefe
| 412226 ||  || — || November 9, 2007 || Kitt Peak || Spacewatch || — || align=right data-sort-value="0.83" | 830 m || 
|-id=227 bgcolor=#fefefe
| 412227 ||  || — || December 11, 2001 || Socorro || LINEAR || H || align=right data-sort-value="0.77" | 770 m || 
|-id=228 bgcolor=#E9E9E9
| 412228 ||  || — || February 29, 2000 || Socorro || LINEAR || — || align=right | 1.5 km || 
|-id=229 bgcolor=#fefefe
| 412229 ||  || — || April 7, 2006 || Catalina || CSS || (2076) || align=right | 1.1 km || 
|-id=230 bgcolor=#fefefe
| 412230 ||  || — || January 29, 2009 || Mount Lemmon || Mount Lemmon Survey || — || align=right data-sort-value="0.90" | 900 m || 
|-id=231 bgcolor=#E9E9E9
| 412231 ||  || — || December 4, 2007 || Kitt Peak || Spacewatch || — || align=right | 1.2 km || 
|-id=232 bgcolor=#fefefe
| 412232 ||  || — || February 1, 2009 || Kitt Peak || Spacewatch || — || align=right | 1.4 km || 
|-id=233 bgcolor=#fefefe
| 412233 ||  || — || March 24, 2006 || Catalina || CSS || — || align=right | 1.2 km || 
|-id=234 bgcolor=#d6d6d6
| 412234 ||  || — || January 30, 2012 || Mount Lemmon || Mount Lemmon Survey || — || align=right | 2.6 km || 
|-id=235 bgcolor=#fefefe
| 412235 ||  || — || April 2, 2006 || Catalina || CSS || — || align=right data-sort-value="0.89" | 890 m || 
|-id=236 bgcolor=#fefefe
| 412236 ||  || — || January 1, 2012 || Mount Lemmon || Mount Lemmon Survey || V || align=right data-sort-value="0.87" | 870 m || 
|-id=237 bgcolor=#E9E9E9
| 412237 ||  || — || March 1, 2009 || Mount Lemmon || Mount Lemmon Survey || — || align=right data-sort-value="0.98" | 980 m || 
|-id=238 bgcolor=#E9E9E9
| 412238 ||  || — || May 29, 2009 || Catalina || CSS || — || align=right | 1.5 km || 
|-id=239 bgcolor=#E9E9E9
| 412239 ||  || — || January 17, 2008 || Mount Lemmon || Mount Lemmon Survey || — || align=right | 2.2 km || 
|-id=240 bgcolor=#d6d6d6
| 412240 ||  || — || March 14, 2007 || Mount Lemmon || Mount Lemmon Survey || HYG || align=right | 2.1 km || 
|-id=241 bgcolor=#E9E9E9
| 412241 ||  || — || November 15, 2006 || Catalina || CSS || — || align=right | 2.5 km || 
|-id=242 bgcolor=#E9E9E9
| 412242 ||  || — || August 1, 2005 || Siding Spring || SSS || — || align=right | 2.1 km || 
|-id=243 bgcolor=#fefefe
| 412243 ||  || — || March 25, 2006 || Kitt Peak || Spacewatch || — || align=right data-sort-value="0.82" | 820 m || 
|-id=244 bgcolor=#E9E9E9
| 412244 ||  || — || October 2, 2006 || Kitt Peak || Spacewatch || — || align=right | 1.0 km || 
|-id=245 bgcolor=#d6d6d6
| 412245 ||  || — || May 3, 2008 || Mount Lemmon || Mount Lemmon Survey || — || align=right | 2.4 km || 
|-id=246 bgcolor=#E9E9E9
| 412246 ||  || — || November 22, 2006 || Mount Lemmon || Mount Lemmon Survey || ADE || align=right | 2.0 km || 
|-id=247 bgcolor=#E9E9E9
| 412247 ||  || — || December 30, 2007 || Kitt Peak || Spacewatch || — || align=right | 1.2 km || 
|-id=248 bgcolor=#fefefe
| 412248 ||  || — || October 1, 2003 || Kitt Peak || Spacewatch || V || align=right data-sort-value="0.66" | 660 m || 
|-id=249 bgcolor=#fefefe
| 412249 ||  || — || October 21, 2011 || Kitt Peak || Spacewatch || V || align=right data-sort-value="0.52" | 520 m || 
|-id=250 bgcolor=#E9E9E9
| 412250 ||  || — || October 8, 2010 || Kitt Peak || Spacewatch || — || align=right data-sort-value="0.86" | 860 m || 
|-id=251 bgcolor=#E9E9E9
| 412251 ||  || — || October 13, 2010 || Kitt Peak || Spacewatch || EUN || align=right | 1.0 km || 
|-id=252 bgcolor=#fefefe
| 412252 ||  || — || January 28, 2006 || Mount Lemmon || Mount Lemmon Survey || — || align=right data-sort-value="0.65" | 650 m || 
|-id=253 bgcolor=#E9E9E9
| 412253 ||  || — || September 29, 2005 || Mount Lemmon || Mount Lemmon Survey || — || align=right | 1.8 km || 
|-id=254 bgcolor=#fefefe
| 412254 ||  || — || October 1, 2003 || Kitt Peak || Spacewatch || — || align=right data-sort-value="0.69" | 690 m || 
|-id=255 bgcolor=#d6d6d6
| 412255 ||  || — || February 28, 2008 || Kitt Peak || Spacewatch || — || align=right | 2.8 km || 
|-id=256 bgcolor=#fefefe
| 412256 ||  || — || October 13, 2001 || Kitt Peak || Spacewatch || — || align=right data-sort-value="0.70" | 700 m || 
|-id=257 bgcolor=#E9E9E9
| 412257 ||  || — || April 29, 2009 || Mount Lemmon || Mount Lemmon Survey || — || align=right data-sort-value="0.98" | 980 m || 
|-id=258 bgcolor=#E9E9E9
| 412258 ||  || — || November 15, 2006 || Kitt Peak || Spacewatch || — || align=right data-sort-value="0.94" | 940 m || 
|-id=259 bgcolor=#E9E9E9
| 412259 ||  || — || September 26, 2005 || Kitt Peak || Spacewatch || GEF || align=right data-sort-value="0.99" | 990 m || 
|-id=260 bgcolor=#fefefe
| 412260 ||  || — || October 24, 1995 || Kitt Peak || Spacewatch || — || align=right data-sort-value="0.57" | 570 m || 
|-id=261 bgcolor=#E9E9E9
| 412261 ||  || — || April 27, 2009 || Mount Lemmon || Mount Lemmon Survey || (5) || align=right data-sort-value="0.58" | 580 m || 
|-id=262 bgcolor=#fefefe
| 412262 ||  || — || October 1, 2003 || Kitt Peak || Spacewatch || MAS || align=right data-sort-value="0.56" | 560 m || 
|-id=263 bgcolor=#fefefe
| 412263 ||  || — || September 29, 2003 || Kitt Peak || Spacewatch || MAS || align=right data-sort-value="0.75" | 750 m || 
|-id=264 bgcolor=#fefefe
| 412264 ||  || — || September 11, 2007 || Kitt Peak || Spacewatch || — || align=right data-sort-value="0.71" | 710 m || 
|-id=265 bgcolor=#fefefe
| 412265 ||  || — || April 8, 2002 || Kitt Peak || Spacewatch || — || align=right data-sort-value="0.87" | 870 m || 
|-id=266 bgcolor=#E9E9E9
| 412266 ||  || — || September 26, 2006 || Kitt Peak || Spacewatch || — || align=right data-sort-value="0.98" | 980 m || 
|-id=267 bgcolor=#fefefe
| 412267 ||  || — || September 22, 2003 || Kitt Peak || Spacewatch || — || align=right data-sort-value="0.73" | 730 m || 
|-id=268 bgcolor=#d6d6d6
| 412268 ||  || — || October 22, 2005 || Kitt Peak || Spacewatch || — || align=right | 1.9 km || 
|-id=269 bgcolor=#E9E9E9
| 412269 ||  || — || October 29, 2010 || Mount Lemmon || Mount Lemmon Survey || — || align=right | 1.3 km || 
|-id=270 bgcolor=#E9E9E9
| 412270 ||  || — || September 29, 2005 || Mount Lemmon || Mount Lemmon Survey || — || align=right | 2.0 km || 
|-id=271 bgcolor=#fefefe
| 412271 ||  || — || November 30, 2008 || Kitt Peak || Spacewatch || (2076) || align=right data-sort-value="0.85" | 850 m || 
|-id=272 bgcolor=#d6d6d6
| 412272 ||  || — || March 13, 2008 || Catalina || CSS || — || align=right | 2.4 km || 
|-id=273 bgcolor=#fefefe
| 412273 ||  || — || March 3, 2006 || Mount Lemmon || Mount Lemmon Survey || — || align=right data-sort-value="0.77" | 770 m || 
|-id=274 bgcolor=#d6d6d6
| 412274 ||  || — || October 22, 2009 || Mount Lemmon || Mount Lemmon Survey || — || align=right | 2.5 km || 
|-id=275 bgcolor=#E9E9E9
| 412275 ||  || — || May 9, 2004 || Kitt Peak || Spacewatch || — || align=right | 1.9 km || 
|-id=276 bgcolor=#d6d6d6
| 412276 ||  || — || January 4, 2012 || Mount Lemmon || Mount Lemmon Survey || BRA || align=right | 1.6 km || 
|-id=277 bgcolor=#E9E9E9
| 412277 ||  || — || May 13, 2004 || Kitt Peak || Spacewatch || AEO || align=right | 1.2 km || 
|-id=278 bgcolor=#E9E9E9
| 412278 ||  || — || October 19, 2006 || Kitt Peak || Spacewatch || RAF || align=right data-sort-value="0.85" | 850 m || 
|-id=279 bgcolor=#E9E9E9
| 412279 ||  || — || September 30, 2006 || Mount Lemmon || Mount Lemmon Survey || — || align=right | 1.5 km || 
|-id=280 bgcolor=#fefefe
| 412280 ||  || — || March 29, 2009 || Kitt Peak || Spacewatch || V || align=right data-sort-value="0.63" | 630 m || 
|-id=281 bgcolor=#E9E9E9
| 412281 ||  || — || April 7, 2005 || Mount Lemmon || Mount Lemmon Survey || — || align=right data-sort-value="0.94" | 940 m || 
|-id=282 bgcolor=#fefefe
| 412282 ||  || — || May 24, 2006 || Mount Lemmon || Mount Lemmon Survey || — || align=right data-sort-value="0.56" | 560 m || 
|-id=283 bgcolor=#E9E9E9
| 412283 ||  || — || January 29, 2012 || Kitt Peak || Spacewatch || — || align=right | 1.6 km || 
|-id=284 bgcolor=#fefefe
| 412284 ||  || — || November 13, 2007 || Mount Lemmon || Mount Lemmon Survey || V || align=right data-sort-value="0.79" | 790 m || 
|-id=285 bgcolor=#d6d6d6
| 412285 ||  || — || March 14, 2007 || Mount Lemmon || Mount Lemmon Survey || — || align=right | 2.8 km || 
|-id=286 bgcolor=#fefefe
| 412286 ||  || — || November 9, 2007 || Mount Lemmon || Mount Lemmon Survey || — || align=right data-sort-value="0.87" | 870 m || 
|-id=287 bgcolor=#E9E9E9
| 412287 ||  || — || February 11, 2008 || Kitt Peak || Spacewatch || — || align=right | 2.2 km || 
|-id=288 bgcolor=#fefefe
| 412288 ||  || — || February 28, 2006 || Catalina || CSS || — || align=right data-sort-value="0.91" | 910 m || 
|-id=289 bgcolor=#E9E9E9
| 412289 ||  || — || April 28, 2000 || Kitt Peak || Spacewatch || — || align=right | 1.6 km || 
|-id=290 bgcolor=#E9E9E9
| 412290 ||  || — || October 2, 2006 || Mount Lemmon || Mount Lemmon Survey || — || align=right | 1.2 km || 
|-id=291 bgcolor=#d6d6d6
| 412291 ||  || — || April 7, 2013 || Kitt Peak || Spacewatch || — || align=right | 2.7 km || 
|-id=292 bgcolor=#E9E9E9
| 412292 ||  || — || May 16, 2004 || Siding Spring || SSS || — || align=right | 2.1 km || 
|-id=293 bgcolor=#E9E9E9
| 412293 ||  || — || December 26, 2006 || Kitt Peak || Spacewatch || — || align=right | 3.1 km || 
|-id=294 bgcolor=#fefefe
| 412294 ||  || — || November 2, 1999 || Kitt Peak || Spacewatch || — || align=right data-sort-value="0.79" | 790 m || 
|-id=295 bgcolor=#d6d6d6
| 412295 ||  || — || May 6, 2002 || Kitt Peak || Spacewatch || — || align=right | 2.6 km || 
|-id=296 bgcolor=#E9E9E9
| 412296 ||  || — || December 15, 2006 || Kitt Peak || Spacewatch || — || align=right | 2.2 km || 
|-id=297 bgcolor=#fefefe
| 412297 ||  || — || February 22, 2006 || Anderson Mesa || LONEOS || — || align=right data-sort-value="0.84" | 840 m || 
|-id=298 bgcolor=#fefefe
| 412298 ||  || — || November 2, 2007 || Mount Lemmon || Mount Lemmon Survey || — || align=right data-sort-value="0.96" | 960 m || 
|-id=299 bgcolor=#fefefe
| 412299 ||  || — || March 23, 2006 || Kitt Peak || Spacewatch || — || align=right data-sort-value="0.86" | 860 m || 
|-id=300 bgcolor=#E9E9E9
| 412300 ||  || — || February 25, 2012 || Mount Lemmon || Mount Lemmon Survey || — || align=right data-sort-value="0.96" | 960 m || 
|}

412301–412400 

|-bgcolor=#E9E9E9
| 412301 ||  || — || February 22, 2004 || Kitt Peak || Spacewatch || — || align=right | 1.3 km || 
|-id=302 bgcolor=#d6d6d6
| 412302 ||  || — || August 31, 2009 || Siding Spring || SSS || — || align=right | 2.9 km || 
|-id=303 bgcolor=#fefefe
| 412303 ||  || — || July 18, 2006 || Siding Spring || SSS || — || align=right | 1.7 km || 
|-id=304 bgcolor=#fefefe
| 412304 ||  || — || April 25, 2006 || Mount Lemmon || Mount Lemmon Survey || — || align=right data-sort-value="0.73" | 730 m || 
|-id=305 bgcolor=#E9E9E9
| 412305 ||  || — || March 10, 2008 || Mount Lemmon || Mount Lemmon Survey || — || align=right | 2.2 km || 
|-id=306 bgcolor=#d6d6d6
| 412306 ||  || — || May 14, 2008 || Mount Lemmon || Mount Lemmon Survey || — || align=right | 2.1 km || 
|-id=307 bgcolor=#fefefe
| 412307 ||  || — || September 20, 2001 || Socorro || LINEAR || — || align=right data-sort-value="0.93" | 930 m || 
|-id=308 bgcolor=#d6d6d6
| 412308 ||  || — || May 22, 2003 || Kitt Peak || Spacewatch || — || align=right | 2.5 km || 
|-id=309 bgcolor=#d6d6d6
| 412309 ||  || — || December 3, 2010 || Mount Lemmon || Mount Lemmon Survey || — || align=right | 1.9 km || 
|-id=310 bgcolor=#d6d6d6
| 412310 ||  || — || April 12, 2002 || Socorro || LINEAR || EOS || align=right | 2.2 km || 
|-id=311 bgcolor=#fefefe
| 412311 ||  || — || March 17, 2009 || Kitt Peak || Spacewatch || — || align=right | 1.0 km || 
|-id=312 bgcolor=#fefefe
| 412312 ||  || — || March 16, 2009 || Kitt Peak || Spacewatch || — || align=right data-sort-value="0.78" | 780 m || 
|-id=313 bgcolor=#d6d6d6
| 412313 ||  || — || September 16, 2009 || Catalina || CSS || EOS || align=right | 2.9 km || 
|-id=314 bgcolor=#fefefe
| 412314 ||  || — || April 2, 2009 || Mount Lemmon || Mount Lemmon Survey || V || align=right data-sort-value="0.75" | 750 m || 
|-id=315 bgcolor=#E9E9E9
| 412315 ||  || — || November 2, 2010 || Mount Lemmon || Mount Lemmon Survey || — || align=right | 2.5 km || 
|-id=316 bgcolor=#fefefe
| 412316 ||  || — || November 20, 2003 || Kitt Peak || Spacewatch || — || align=right data-sort-value="0.97" | 970 m || 
|-id=317 bgcolor=#d6d6d6
| 412317 ||  || — || December 25, 2005 || Kitt Peak || Spacewatch || — || align=right | 3.2 km || 
|-id=318 bgcolor=#E9E9E9
| 412318 ||  || — || May 16, 2009 || Mount Lemmon || Mount Lemmon Survey || — || align=right | 1.2 km || 
|-id=319 bgcolor=#fefefe
| 412319 ||  || — || May 28, 2010 || WISE || WISE || — || align=right | 1.0 km || 
|-id=320 bgcolor=#fefefe
| 412320 ||  || — || December 25, 2005 || Kitt Peak || Spacewatch || — || align=right data-sort-value="0.61" | 610 m || 
|-id=321 bgcolor=#fefefe
| 412321 ||  || — || January 23, 2006 || Kitt Peak || Spacewatch || — || align=right data-sort-value="0.82" | 820 m || 
|-id=322 bgcolor=#fefefe
| 412322 ||  || — || November 24, 2008 || Mount Lemmon || Mount Lemmon Survey || — || align=right data-sort-value="0.71" | 710 m || 
|-id=323 bgcolor=#E9E9E9
| 412323 ||  || — || October 20, 2006 || Kitt Peak || Spacewatch || — || align=right | 1.4 km || 
|-id=324 bgcolor=#E9E9E9
| 412324 ||  || — || October 2, 2006 || Mount Lemmon || Mount Lemmon Survey || — || align=right | 1.1 km || 
|-id=325 bgcolor=#d6d6d6
| 412325 ||  || — || December 4, 2005 || Kitt Peak || Spacewatch || — || align=right | 2.7 km || 
|-id=326 bgcolor=#E9E9E9
| 412326 ||  || — || September 11, 2001 || Kitt Peak || Spacewatch || MIS || align=right | 2.7 km || 
|-id=327 bgcolor=#d6d6d6
| 412327 ||  || — || September 14, 2009 || Kitt Peak || Spacewatch || — || align=right | 2.3 km || 
|-id=328 bgcolor=#E9E9E9
| 412328 ||  || — || September 30, 2006 || Mount Lemmon || Mount Lemmon Survey || — || align=right | 1.5 km || 
|-id=329 bgcolor=#d6d6d6
| 412329 ||  || — || April 3, 2008 || Kitt Peak || Spacewatch || BRA || align=right | 1.4 km || 
|-id=330 bgcolor=#E9E9E9
| 412330 ||  || — || June 1, 2009 || Catalina || CSS || EUN || align=right | 1.7 km || 
|-id=331 bgcolor=#E9E9E9
| 412331 ||  || — || October 3, 2006 || Mount Lemmon || Mount Lemmon Survey || — || align=right data-sort-value="0.88" | 880 m || 
|-id=332 bgcolor=#E9E9E9
| 412332 ||  || — || March 22, 2004 || Socorro || LINEAR || EUN || align=right | 1.4 km || 
|-id=333 bgcolor=#E9E9E9
| 412333 ||  || — || November 23, 1997 || Kitt Peak || Spacewatch || ADE || align=right | 2.5 km || 
|-id=334 bgcolor=#E9E9E9
| 412334 ||  || — || August 10, 2010 || Kitt Peak || Spacewatch || EUN || align=right | 1.6 km || 
|-id=335 bgcolor=#E9E9E9
| 412335 ||  || — || October 3, 2006 || Mount Lemmon || Mount Lemmon Survey || — || align=right | 1.1 km || 
|-id=336 bgcolor=#d6d6d6
| 412336 ||  || — || March 10, 2007 || Mount Lemmon || Mount Lemmon Survey || THM || align=right | 2.2 km || 
|-id=337 bgcolor=#E9E9E9
| 412337 ||  || — || November 17, 2006 || Mount Lemmon || Mount Lemmon Survey || EUN || align=right | 1.6 km || 
|-id=338 bgcolor=#d6d6d6
| 412338 ||  || — || October 19, 2003 || Kitt Peak || Spacewatch || TIR || align=right | 2.4 km || 
|-id=339 bgcolor=#E9E9E9
| 412339 ||  || — || October 13, 2006 || Kitt Peak || Spacewatch || — || align=right | 1.1 km || 
|-id=340 bgcolor=#fefefe
| 412340 ||  || — || February 22, 2001 || Kitt Peak || Spacewatch || — || align=right data-sort-value="0.92" | 920 m || 
|-id=341 bgcolor=#E9E9E9
| 412341 ||  || — || October 8, 2005 || Kitt Peak || Spacewatch || MRX || align=right data-sort-value="0.95" | 950 m || 
|-id=342 bgcolor=#E9E9E9
| 412342 ||  || — || October 23, 2006 || Mount Lemmon || Mount Lemmon Survey || — || align=right | 1.2 km || 
|-id=343 bgcolor=#E9E9E9
| 412343 ||  || — || November 10, 2006 || Kitt Peak || Spacewatch || — || align=right | 3.0 km || 
|-id=344 bgcolor=#E9E9E9
| 412344 ||  || — || June 3, 2009 || Mount Lemmon || Mount Lemmon Survey || — || align=right | 3.5 km || 
|-id=345 bgcolor=#d6d6d6
| 412345 ||  || — || December 14, 2010 || Mount Lemmon || Mount Lemmon Survey || — || align=right | 2.8 km || 
|-id=346 bgcolor=#E9E9E9
| 412346 ||  || — || December 15, 2007 || Kitt Peak || Spacewatch || — || align=right | 1.3 km || 
|-id=347 bgcolor=#E9E9E9
| 412347 ||  || — || September 25, 2005 || Catalina || CSS || EUN || align=right | 1.4 km || 
|-id=348 bgcolor=#d6d6d6
| 412348 ||  || — || October 17, 2009 || Mount Lemmon || Mount Lemmon Survey || HYG || align=right | 2.6 km || 
|-id=349 bgcolor=#E9E9E9
| 412349 ||  || — || November 23, 2006 || Kitt Peak || Spacewatch || ADE || align=right | 2.2 km || 
|-id=350 bgcolor=#d6d6d6
| 412350 ||  || — || October 8, 2004 || Kitt Peak || Spacewatch || EOS || align=right | 2.3 km || 
|-id=351 bgcolor=#d6d6d6
| 412351 ||  || — || March 18, 2007 || Kitt Peak || Spacewatch || — || align=right | 2.7 km || 
|-id=352 bgcolor=#E9E9E9
| 412352 ||  || — || March 31, 2008 || Kitt Peak || Spacewatch || — || align=right | 2.0 km || 
|-id=353 bgcolor=#E9E9E9
| 412353 ||  || — || October 19, 2010 || Mount Lemmon || Mount Lemmon Survey || — || align=right | 1.5 km || 
|-id=354 bgcolor=#fefefe
| 412354 ||  || — || October 9, 2007 || Mount Lemmon || Mount Lemmon Survey || — || align=right data-sort-value="0.81" | 810 m || 
|-id=355 bgcolor=#d6d6d6
| 412355 ||  || — || October 5, 2003 || Kitt Peak || Spacewatch || — || align=right | 2.5 km || 
|-id=356 bgcolor=#d6d6d6
| 412356 ||  || — || May 12, 2013 || Mount Lemmon || Mount Lemmon Survey || (1118) || align=right | 3.6 km || 
|-id=357 bgcolor=#d6d6d6
| 412357 ||  || — || November 8, 2009 || Mount Lemmon || Mount Lemmon Survey || — || align=right | 2.4 km || 
|-id=358 bgcolor=#E9E9E9
| 412358 ||  || — || April 21, 2004 || Kitt Peak || Spacewatch || — || align=right | 2.7 km || 
|-id=359 bgcolor=#fefefe
| 412359 ||  || — || April 27, 2000 || Socorro || LINEAR || — || align=right data-sort-value="0.88" | 880 m || 
|-id=360 bgcolor=#E9E9E9
| 412360 ||  || — || October 20, 2006 || Mount Lemmon || Mount Lemmon Survey || — || align=right | 1.1 km || 
|-id=361 bgcolor=#d6d6d6
| 412361 ||  || — || November 10, 2009 || Kitt Peak || Spacewatch || — || align=right | 3.1 km || 
|-id=362 bgcolor=#E9E9E9
| 412362 ||  || — || September 25, 2005 || Kitt Peak || Spacewatch || — || align=right | 2.3 km || 
|-id=363 bgcolor=#E9E9E9
| 412363 ||  || — || April 4, 2008 || Kitt Peak || Spacewatch || — || align=right | 2.2 km || 
|-id=364 bgcolor=#d6d6d6
| 412364 ||  || — || September 7, 2004 || Kitt Peak || Spacewatch || — || align=right | 1.9 km || 
|-id=365 bgcolor=#E9E9E9
| 412365 ||  || — || September 30, 2010 || Mount Lemmon || Mount Lemmon Survey || — || align=right | 1.1 km || 
|-id=366 bgcolor=#E9E9E9
| 412366 ||  || — || May 15, 1996 || Kitt Peak || Spacewatch || — || align=right | 1.5 km || 
|-id=367 bgcolor=#E9E9E9
| 412367 ||  || — || September 27, 2006 || Mount Lemmon || Mount Lemmon Survey || — || align=right | 1.1 km || 
|-id=368 bgcolor=#d6d6d6
| 412368 ||  || — || December 14, 2004 || Kitt Peak || Spacewatch || EOS || align=right | 2.1 km || 
|-id=369 bgcolor=#d6d6d6
| 412369 ||  || — || June 13, 2007 || Kitt Peak || Spacewatch || — || align=right | 3.2 km || 
|-id=370 bgcolor=#E9E9E9
| 412370 ||  || — || December 15, 2001 || Socorro || LINEAR || — || align=right | 3.1 km || 
|-id=371 bgcolor=#d6d6d6
| 412371 ||  || — || August 20, 2008 || Kitt Peak || Spacewatch || EOS || align=right | 2.1 km || 
|-id=372 bgcolor=#d6d6d6
| 412372 ||  || — || April 1, 2012 || Mount Lemmon || Mount Lemmon Survey || — || align=right | 3.0 km || 
|-id=373 bgcolor=#d6d6d6
| 412373 ||  || — || December 15, 2009 || Mount Lemmon || Mount Lemmon Survey || — || align=right | 4.5 km || 
|-id=374 bgcolor=#d6d6d6
| 412374 ||  || — || October 23, 2009 || Mount Lemmon || Mount Lemmon Survey || — || align=right | 2.5 km || 
|-id=375 bgcolor=#d6d6d6
| 412375 ||  || — || September 16, 2009 || Kitt Peak || Spacewatch || — || align=right | 2.4 km || 
|-id=376 bgcolor=#d6d6d6
| 412376 ||  || — || October 3, 1997 || Caussols || ODAS || — || align=right | 3.2 km || 
|-id=377 bgcolor=#d6d6d6
| 412377 ||  || — || September 28, 2008 || Catalina || CSS || — || align=right | 3.4 km || 
|-id=378 bgcolor=#E9E9E9
| 412378 ||  || — || December 22, 2005 || Catalina || CSS || — || align=right | 2.6 km || 
|-id=379 bgcolor=#d6d6d6
| 412379 ||  || — || October 27, 2008 || Catalina || CSS || — || align=right | 5.7 km || 
|-id=380 bgcolor=#d6d6d6
| 412380 ||  || — || July 21, 2006 || Mount Lemmon || Mount Lemmon Survey || 3:2 || align=right | 5.5 km || 
|-id=381 bgcolor=#d6d6d6
| 412381 ||  || — || May 26, 2007 || Mount Lemmon || Mount Lemmon Survey || EMA || align=right | 3.0 km || 
|-id=382 bgcolor=#d6d6d6
| 412382 ||  || — || November 3, 2010 || Mount Lemmon || Mount Lemmon Survey || — || align=right | 3.5 km || 
|-id=383 bgcolor=#d6d6d6
| 412383 ||  || — || October 26, 2008 || Mount Lemmon || Mount Lemmon Survey || — || align=right | 3.0 km || 
|-id=384 bgcolor=#d6d6d6
| 412384 ||  || — || January 28, 2011 || Kitt Peak || Spacewatch || — || align=right | 2.8 km || 
|-id=385 bgcolor=#d6d6d6
| 412385 ||  || — || September 23, 2008 || Mount Lemmon || Mount Lemmon Survey || EOS || align=right | 1.9 km || 
|-id=386 bgcolor=#C2FFFF
| 412386 ||  || — || February 28, 2008 || Kitt Peak || Spacewatch || L5 || align=right | 10 km || 
|-id=387 bgcolor=#d6d6d6
| 412387 ||  || — || December 27, 2005 || Kitt Peak || Spacewatch || — || align=right | 2.7 km || 
|-id=388 bgcolor=#d6d6d6
| 412388 ||  || — || January 13, 2005 || Kitt Peak || Spacewatch || — || align=right | 3.6 km || 
|-id=389 bgcolor=#d6d6d6
| 412389 ||  || — || December 13, 2010 || Mount Lemmon || Mount Lemmon Survey || EOS || align=right | 2.3 km || 
|-id=390 bgcolor=#d6d6d6
| 412390 ||  || — || August 31, 2005 || Kitt Peak || Spacewatch || 3:2 || align=right | 4.4 km || 
|-id=391 bgcolor=#d6d6d6
| 412391 ||  || — || May 4, 2006 || Siding Spring || SSS || — || align=right | 3.9 km || 
|-id=392 bgcolor=#d6d6d6
| 412392 ||  || — || February 22, 2006 || Kitt Peak || Spacewatch || — || align=right | 3.4 km || 
|-id=393 bgcolor=#d6d6d6
| 412393 ||  || — || January 15, 2004 || Kitt Peak || Spacewatch || EOS || align=right | 4.2 km || 
|-id=394 bgcolor=#C2FFFF
| 412394 ||  || — || April 29, 2008 || Mount Lemmon || Mount Lemmon Survey || L5 || align=right | 8.6 km || 
|-id=395 bgcolor=#C2FFFF
| 412395 ||  || — || March 8, 2008 || Kitt Peak || Spacewatch || L5 || align=right | 10 km || 
|-id=396 bgcolor=#d6d6d6
| 412396 ||  || — || March 6, 2006 || Kitt Peak || Spacewatch || EOS || align=right | 1.8 km || 
|-id=397 bgcolor=#E9E9E9
| 412397 ||  || — || December 16, 1999 || Kitt Peak || Spacewatch || — || align=right | 2.7 km || 
|-id=398 bgcolor=#E9E9E9
| 412398 ||  || — || September 19, 2003 || Kitt Peak || Spacewatch || — || align=right | 2.4 km || 
|-id=399 bgcolor=#E9E9E9
| 412399 ||  || — || November 24, 2009 || Mount Lemmon || Mount Lemmon Survey || EUN || align=right | 2.2 km || 
|-id=400 bgcolor=#E9E9E9
| 412400 ||  || — || February 2, 2005 || Catalina || CSS || — || align=right | 2.9 km || 
|}

412401–412500 

|-bgcolor=#fefefe
| 412401 ||  || — || September 13, 2007 || Catalina || CSS || H || align=right data-sort-value="0.78" | 780 m || 
|-id=402 bgcolor=#E9E9E9
| 412402 ||  || — || October 9, 2008 || Mount Lemmon || Mount Lemmon Survey || — || align=right data-sort-value="0.96" | 960 m || 
|-id=403 bgcolor=#fefefe
| 412403 ||  || — || July 5, 2005 || Mount Lemmon || Mount Lemmon Survey || — || align=right data-sort-value="0.73" | 730 m || 
|-id=404 bgcolor=#d6d6d6
| 412404 ||  || — || October 15, 2007 || Mount Lemmon || Mount Lemmon Survey || — || align=right | 2.5 km || 
|-id=405 bgcolor=#E9E9E9
| 412405 ||  || — || January 26, 2006 || Mount Lemmon || Mount Lemmon Survey || MAR || align=right | 1.2 km || 
|-id=406 bgcolor=#fefefe
| 412406 ||  || — || March 13, 2003 || Kitt Peak || Spacewatch || — || align=right data-sort-value="0.74" | 740 m || 
|-id=407 bgcolor=#fefefe
| 412407 ||  || — || February 17, 2007 || Mount Lemmon || Mount Lemmon Survey || — || align=right data-sort-value="0.70" | 700 m || 
|-id=408 bgcolor=#fefefe
| 412408 ||  || — || July 12, 2005 || Mount Lemmon || Mount Lemmon Survey || — || align=right data-sort-value="0.92" | 920 m || 
|-id=409 bgcolor=#E9E9E9
| 412409 ||  || — || March 8, 2005 || Anderson Mesa || LONEOS || — || align=right | 2.0 km || 
|-id=410 bgcolor=#E9E9E9
| 412410 ||  || — || February 19, 2010 || Mount Lemmon || Mount Lemmon Survey || — || align=right | 1.8 km || 
|-id=411 bgcolor=#E9E9E9
| 412411 ||  || — || March 8, 2005 || Mount Lemmon || Mount Lemmon Survey || — || align=right | 2.2 km || 
|-id=412 bgcolor=#fefefe
| 412412 ||  || — || September 29, 2005 || Mount Lemmon || Mount Lemmon Survey || MAS || align=right data-sort-value="0.73" | 730 m || 
|-id=413 bgcolor=#d6d6d6
| 412413 ||  || — || September 20, 1995 || Kitt Peak || Spacewatch || EOS || align=right | 2.9 km || 
|-id=414 bgcolor=#E9E9E9
| 412414 ||  || — || September 4, 1999 || Anderson Mesa || LONEOS || — || align=right | 4.2 km || 
|-id=415 bgcolor=#E9E9E9
| 412415 ||  || — || September 23, 2008 || Mount Lemmon || Mount Lemmon Survey || (5) || align=right data-sort-value="0.87" | 870 m || 
|-id=416 bgcolor=#d6d6d6
| 412416 ||  || — || February 7, 2008 || Mount Lemmon || Mount Lemmon Survey || — || align=right | 3.6 km || 
|-id=417 bgcolor=#fefefe
| 412417 ||  || — || November 3, 2005 || Mount Lemmon || Mount Lemmon Survey || ERI || align=right | 2.0 km || 
|-id=418 bgcolor=#fefefe
| 412418 ||  || — || January 28, 2007 || Mount Lemmon || Mount Lemmon Survey || — || align=right data-sort-value="0.89" | 890 m || 
|-id=419 bgcolor=#d6d6d6
| 412419 ||  || — || June 6, 2010 || Kitt Peak || Spacewatch || BRA || align=right | 1.6 km || 
|-id=420 bgcolor=#E9E9E9
| 412420 ||  || — || October 8, 2008 || Kitt Peak || Spacewatch || — || align=right | 1.2 km || 
|-id=421 bgcolor=#d6d6d6
| 412421 ||  || — || October 4, 2006 || Mount Lemmon || Mount Lemmon Survey || — || align=right | 3.1 km || 
|-id=422 bgcolor=#fefefe
| 412422 ||  || — || November 2, 2008 || Kitt Peak || Spacewatch || MAS || align=right data-sort-value="0.77" | 770 m || 
|-id=423 bgcolor=#fefefe
| 412423 ||  || — || November 30, 1995 || Kitt Peak || Spacewatch || — || align=right data-sort-value="0.76" | 760 m || 
|-id=424 bgcolor=#fefefe
| 412424 ||  || — || April 30, 1997 || Socorro || LINEAR || — || align=right data-sort-value="0.70" | 700 m || 
|-id=425 bgcolor=#d6d6d6
| 412425 ||  || — || September 27, 2006 || Kitt Peak || Spacewatch || TIR || align=right | 3.2 km || 
|-id=426 bgcolor=#E9E9E9
| 412426 ||  || — || November 8, 2007 || Kitt Peak || Spacewatch || — || align=right | 2.8 km || 
|-id=427 bgcolor=#E9E9E9
| 412427 ||  || — || April 9, 1997 || Kitt Peak || Spacewatch || — || align=right | 2.0 km || 
|-id=428 bgcolor=#fefefe
| 412428 ||  || — || August 23, 2008 || Siding Spring || SSS || — || align=right | 2.6 km || 
|-id=429 bgcolor=#E9E9E9
| 412429 ||  || — || March 17, 2010 || Kitt Peak || Spacewatch || — || align=right | 1.0 km || 
|-id=430 bgcolor=#E9E9E9
| 412430 ||  || — || June 11, 2005 || Kitt Peak || Spacewatch || DOR || align=right | 2.6 km || 
|-id=431 bgcolor=#fefefe
| 412431 ||  || — || May 11, 2003 || Kitt Peak || Spacewatch || — || align=right data-sort-value="0.90" | 900 m || 
|-id=432 bgcolor=#C2FFFF
| 412432 ||  || — || December 14, 2010 || Mount Lemmon || Mount Lemmon Survey || L4 || align=right | 8.7 km || 
|-id=433 bgcolor=#fefefe
| 412433 ||  || — || October 26, 2005 || Kitt Peak || Spacewatch || V || align=right data-sort-value="0.78" | 780 m || 
|-id=434 bgcolor=#E9E9E9
| 412434 ||  || — || September 18, 1998 || Kitt Peak || Spacewatch || — || align=right | 2.2 km || 
|-id=435 bgcolor=#fefefe
| 412435 ||  || — || January 4, 2010 || Kitt Peak || Spacewatch || — || align=right data-sort-value="0.89" | 890 m || 
|-id=436 bgcolor=#E9E9E9
| 412436 ||  || — || December 5, 2000 || Socorro || LINEAR || MAR || align=right | 1.9 km || 
|-id=437 bgcolor=#E9E9E9
| 412437 ||  || — || December 11, 2004 || Kitt Peak || Spacewatch || — || align=right | 1.3 km || 
|-id=438 bgcolor=#E9E9E9
| 412438 ||  || — || February 29, 2000 || Socorro || LINEAR || — || align=right | 2.9 km || 
|-id=439 bgcolor=#fefefe
| 412439 ||  || — || September 24, 2008 || Mount Lemmon || Mount Lemmon Survey || — || align=right | 1.2 km || 
|-id=440 bgcolor=#fefefe
| 412440 ||  || — || June 11, 2005 || Kitt Peak || Spacewatch || — || align=right | 1.1 km || 
|-id=441 bgcolor=#d6d6d6
| 412441 ||  || — || March 18, 2009 || Kitt Peak || Spacewatch || — || align=right | 2.2 km || 
|-id=442 bgcolor=#fefefe
| 412442 ||  || — || April 11, 2007 || Kitt Peak || Spacewatch || — || align=right data-sort-value="0.86" | 860 m || 
|-id=443 bgcolor=#E9E9E9
| 412443 ||  || — || October 18, 2007 || Kitt Peak || Spacewatch || (5) || align=right data-sort-value="0.74" | 740 m || 
|-id=444 bgcolor=#E9E9E9
| 412444 ||  || — || July 22, 1995 || Kitt Peak || Spacewatch || — || align=right | 1.3 km || 
|-id=445 bgcolor=#d6d6d6
| 412445 ||  || — || August 31, 2005 || Kitt Peak || Spacewatch || — || align=right | 4.2 km || 
|-id=446 bgcolor=#d6d6d6
| 412446 ||  || — || April 11, 2003 || Kitt Peak || Spacewatch || TIR || align=right | 2.8 km || 
|-id=447 bgcolor=#d6d6d6
| 412447 ||  || — || April 20, 2009 || Mount Lemmon || Mount Lemmon Survey || — || align=right | 2.5 km || 
|-id=448 bgcolor=#E9E9E9
| 412448 ||  || — || April 10, 2010 || Kitt Peak || Spacewatch || — || align=right | 1.3 km || 
|-id=449 bgcolor=#d6d6d6
| 412449 ||  || — || September 30, 2005 || Mount Lemmon || Mount Lemmon Survey || — || align=right | 3.0 km || 
|-id=450 bgcolor=#d6d6d6
| 412450 ||  || — || February 27, 2003 || Campo Imperatore || CINEOS || — || align=right | 2.6 km || 
|-id=451 bgcolor=#E9E9E9
| 412451 ||  || — || September 10, 2007 || Kitt Peak || Spacewatch || — || align=right | 2.2 km || 
|-id=452 bgcolor=#fefefe
| 412452 ||  || — || May 11, 1996 || Kitt Peak || Spacewatch || NYS || align=right | 1.8 km || 
|-id=453 bgcolor=#E9E9E9
| 412453 ||  || — || October 7, 2007 || Catalina || CSS || PAD || align=right | 2.4 km || 
|-id=454 bgcolor=#E9E9E9
| 412454 ||  || — || January 15, 2004 || Kitt Peak || Spacewatch || — || align=right | 2.9 km || 
|-id=455 bgcolor=#E9E9E9
| 412455 ||  || — || April 16, 2005 || Kitt Peak || Spacewatch || — || align=right | 2.2 km || 
|-id=456 bgcolor=#fefefe
| 412456 ||  || — || April 30, 2003 || Socorro || LINEAR || NYS || align=right data-sort-value="0.80" | 800 m || 
|-id=457 bgcolor=#fefefe
| 412457 ||  || — || September 4, 2007 || Catalina || CSS || — || align=right | 2.0 km || 
|-id=458 bgcolor=#fefefe
| 412458 ||  || — || April 5, 2003 || Kitt Peak || Spacewatch || NYS || align=right data-sort-value="0.72" | 720 m || 
|-id=459 bgcolor=#d6d6d6
| 412459 ||  || — || December 17, 2001 || Socorro || LINEAR || — || align=right | 4.1 km || 
|-id=460 bgcolor=#E9E9E9
| 412460 ||  || — || May 19, 2010 || Kitt Peak || Spacewatch || — || align=right | 2.0 km || 
|-id=461 bgcolor=#E9E9E9
| 412461 ||  || — || January 21, 2010 || WISE || WISE || — || align=right | 2.5 km || 
|-id=462 bgcolor=#fefefe
| 412462 ||  || — || March 15, 2007 || Mount Lemmon || Mount Lemmon Survey || NYS || align=right data-sort-value="0.65" | 650 m || 
|-id=463 bgcolor=#fefefe
| 412463 ||  || — || September 11, 2004 || Kitt Peak || Spacewatch || — || align=right data-sort-value="0.81" | 810 m || 
|-id=464 bgcolor=#E9E9E9
| 412464 ||  || — || December 1, 2003 || Kitt Peak || Spacewatch || — || align=right | 1.9 km || 
|-id=465 bgcolor=#E9E9E9
| 412465 ||  || — || August 26, 2011 || Kitt Peak || Spacewatch || — || align=right | 1.5 km || 
|-id=466 bgcolor=#E9E9E9
| 412466 ||  || — || April 15, 2005 || Anderson Mesa || LONEOS || NEM || align=right | 2.6 km || 
|-id=467 bgcolor=#fefefe
| 412467 ||  || — || August 20, 1995 || Kitt Peak || Spacewatch || — || align=right data-sort-value="0.76" | 760 m || 
|-id=468 bgcolor=#E9E9E9
| 412468 ||  || — || April 13, 2005 || Catalina || CSS || — || align=right | 2.2 km || 
|-id=469 bgcolor=#E9E9E9
| 412469 ||  || — || April 7, 2005 || Kitt Peak || Spacewatch || — || align=right | 1.9 km || 
|-id=470 bgcolor=#E9E9E9
| 412470 ||  || — || April 20, 2010 || Kitt Peak || Spacewatch || — || align=right data-sort-value="0.95" | 950 m || 
|-id=471 bgcolor=#fefefe
| 412471 ||  || — || November 10, 2005 || Mount Lemmon || Mount Lemmon Survey || — || align=right | 1.0 km || 
|-id=472 bgcolor=#d6d6d6
| 412472 ||  || — || October 20, 2006 || Mount Lemmon || Mount Lemmon Survey || — || align=right | 3.3 km || 
|-id=473 bgcolor=#fefefe
| 412473 ||  || — || December 27, 2009 || Kitt Peak || Spacewatch || — || align=right data-sort-value="0.88" | 880 m || 
|-id=474 bgcolor=#fefefe
| 412474 ||  || — || March 1, 2011 || Catalina || CSS || H || align=right data-sort-value="0.69" | 690 m || 
|-id=475 bgcolor=#E9E9E9
| 412475 ||  || — || March 24, 2006 || Kitt Peak || Spacewatch || — || align=right | 1.1 km || 
|-id=476 bgcolor=#d6d6d6
| 412476 ||  || — || November 9, 1999 || Kitt Peak || Spacewatch || — || align=right | 3.0 km || 
|-id=477 bgcolor=#C2FFFF
| 412477 ||  || — || September 6, 2008 || Kitt Peak || Spacewatch || L4 || align=right | 11 km || 
|-id=478 bgcolor=#fefefe
| 412478 ||  || — || September 7, 2011 || Kitt Peak || Spacewatch || — || align=right | 1.0 km || 
|-id=479 bgcolor=#d6d6d6
| 412479 ||  || — || December 15, 2006 || Kitt Peak || Spacewatch || — || align=right | 5.4 km || 
|-id=480 bgcolor=#fefefe
| 412480 ||  || — || March 11, 2007 || Kitt Peak || Spacewatch || — || align=right | 1.0 km || 
|-id=481 bgcolor=#E9E9E9
| 412481 ||  || — || April 30, 1997 || Socorro || LINEAR || — || align=right | 1.8 km || 
|-id=482 bgcolor=#d6d6d6
| 412482 ||  || — || March 10, 2008 || Catalina || CSS || — || align=right | 3.6 km || 
|-id=483 bgcolor=#d6d6d6
| 412483 ||  || — || December 30, 2007 || Kitt Peak || Spacewatch || — || align=right | 2.7 km || 
|-id=484 bgcolor=#E9E9E9
| 412484 ||  || — || December 18, 2004 || Mount Lemmon || Mount Lemmon Survey || — || align=right | 1.4 km || 
|-id=485 bgcolor=#E9E9E9
| 412485 ||  || — || January 13, 2005 || Kitt Peak || Spacewatch || — || align=right | 1.5 km || 
|-id=486 bgcolor=#d6d6d6
| 412486 ||  || — || February 9, 2008 || Mount Lemmon || Mount Lemmon Survey || — || align=right | 4.4 km || 
|-id=487 bgcolor=#fefefe
| 412487 ||  || — || March 15, 2007 || Mount Lemmon || Mount Lemmon Survey || — || align=right data-sort-value="0.80" | 800 m || 
|-id=488 bgcolor=#fefefe
| 412488 ||  || — || March 9, 2007 || Kitt Peak || Spacewatch || — || align=right data-sort-value="0.63" | 630 m || 
|-id=489 bgcolor=#d6d6d6
| 412489 ||  || — || March 6, 2008 || Mount Lemmon || Mount Lemmon Survey || — || align=right | 3.8 km || 
|-id=490 bgcolor=#E9E9E9
| 412490 ||  || — || March 24, 2006 || Mount Lemmon || Mount Lemmon Survey || — || align=right | 1.1 km || 
|-id=491 bgcolor=#fefefe
| 412491 ||  || — || January 5, 2006 || Kitt Peak || Spacewatch || — || align=right data-sort-value="0.91" | 910 m || 
|-id=492 bgcolor=#fefefe
| 412492 ||  || — || December 7, 2005 || Kitt Peak || Spacewatch || — || align=right data-sort-value="0.93" | 930 m || 
|-id=493 bgcolor=#E9E9E9
| 412493 ||  || — || January 16, 2005 || Kitt Peak || Spacewatch || — || align=right | 1.5 km || 
|-id=494 bgcolor=#E9E9E9
| 412494 ||  || — || May 3, 2010 || Kitt Peak || Spacewatch || — || align=right | 1.0 km || 
|-id=495 bgcolor=#E9E9E9
| 412495 ||  || — || August 27, 2006 || Kitt Peak || Spacewatch || — || align=right | 1.8 km || 
|-id=496 bgcolor=#fefefe
| 412496 ||  || — || March 12, 2003 || Kitt Peak || Spacewatch || — || align=right data-sort-value="0.95" | 950 m || 
|-id=497 bgcolor=#d6d6d6
| 412497 ||  || — || September 1, 2005 || Kitt Peak || Spacewatch || — || align=right | 3.4 km || 
|-id=498 bgcolor=#fefefe
| 412498 ||  || — || September 22, 2008 || Mount Lemmon || Mount Lemmon Survey || V || align=right data-sort-value="0.78" | 780 m || 
|-id=499 bgcolor=#d6d6d6
| 412499 ||  || — || November 27, 2006 || Mount Lemmon || Mount Lemmon Survey || — || align=right | 3.2 km || 
|-id=500 bgcolor=#E9E9E9
| 412500 ||  || — || September 18, 2003 || Kitt Peak || Spacewatch || — || align=right data-sort-value="0.89" | 890 m || 
|}

412501–412600 

|-bgcolor=#E9E9E9
| 412501 ||  || — || September 11, 2007 || Kitt Peak || Spacewatch || — || align=right | 2.2 km || 
|-id=502 bgcolor=#E9E9E9
| 412502 ||  || — || December 28, 2000 || Kitt Peak || Spacewatch || — || align=right | 1.1 km || 
|-id=503 bgcolor=#d6d6d6
| 412503 ||  || — || January 17, 2007 || Kitt Peak || Spacewatch || EOS || align=right | 2.3 km || 
|-id=504 bgcolor=#fefefe
| 412504 ||  || — || September 24, 2000 || Socorro || LINEAR || — || align=right | 1.1 km || 
|-id=505 bgcolor=#E9E9E9
| 412505 ||  || — || May 30, 2006 || Siding Spring || SSS || — || align=right | 2.6 km || 
|-id=506 bgcolor=#d6d6d6
| 412506 ||  || — || July 28, 2009 || Catalina || CSS || — || align=right | 4.1 km || 
|-id=507 bgcolor=#d6d6d6
| 412507 ||  || — || May 2, 2003 || Kitt Peak || Spacewatch || — || align=right | 4.1 km || 
|-id=508 bgcolor=#E9E9E9
| 412508 ||  || — || May 20, 2010 || WISE || WISE || ADE || align=right | 2.9 km || 
|-id=509 bgcolor=#FA8072
| 412509 ||  || — || August 19, 2001 || Socorro || LINEAR || H || align=right data-sort-value="0.81" | 810 m || 
|-id=510 bgcolor=#E9E9E9
| 412510 ||  || — || March 26, 2009 || Mount Lemmon || Mount Lemmon Survey || — || align=right | 1.9 km || 
|-id=511 bgcolor=#fefefe
| 412511 ||  || — || December 1, 2003 || Kitt Peak || Spacewatch || — || align=right | 1.0 km || 
|-id=512 bgcolor=#FA8072
| 412512 ||  || — || October 7, 2004 || Anderson Mesa || LONEOS || — || align=right | 2.4 km || 
|-id=513 bgcolor=#fefefe
| 412513 ||  || — || April 10, 2010 || Kitt Peak || Spacewatch || SUL || align=right | 2.6 km || 
|-id=514 bgcolor=#E9E9E9
| 412514 ||  || — || November 19, 2007 || Mount Lemmon || Mount Lemmon Survey || — || align=right | 2.9 km || 
|-id=515 bgcolor=#fefefe
| 412515 ||  || — || December 10, 2004 || Socorro || LINEAR || — || align=right data-sort-value="0.94" | 940 m || 
|-id=516 bgcolor=#fefefe
| 412516 ||  || — || September 4, 2008 || Kitt Peak || Spacewatch || — || align=right data-sort-value="0.81" | 810 m || 
|-id=517 bgcolor=#fefefe
| 412517 ||  || — || December 19, 1995 || Kitt Peak || Spacewatch || MAS || align=right | 1.1 km || 
|-id=518 bgcolor=#fefefe
| 412518 ||  || — || April 8, 2003 || Kitt Peak || Spacewatch || — || align=right data-sort-value="0.83" | 830 m || 
|-id=519 bgcolor=#fefefe
| 412519 ||  || — || February 28, 2009 || Kitt Peak || Spacewatch || — || align=right | 1.2 km || 
|-id=520 bgcolor=#fefefe
| 412520 ||  || — || December 25, 2005 || Kitt Peak || Spacewatch || — || align=right data-sort-value="0.93" | 930 m || 
|-id=521 bgcolor=#fefefe
| 412521 ||  || — || September 15, 2004 || Anderson Mesa || LONEOS || — || align=right data-sort-value="0.79" | 790 m || 
|-id=522 bgcolor=#fefefe
| 412522 ||  || — || September 24, 2008 || Kitt Peak || Spacewatch || V || align=right data-sort-value="0.83" | 830 m || 
|-id=523 bgcolor=#fefefe
| 412523 ||  || — || May 27, 2000 || Socorro || LINEAR || — || align=right | 1.1 km || 
|-id=524 bgcolor=#fefefe
| 412524 ||  || — || October 23, 2003 || Kitt Peak || Spacewatch || NYS || align=right data-sort-value="0.80" | 800 m || 
|-id=525 bgcolor=#E9E9E9
| 412525 ||  || — || May 25, 2010 || WISE || WISE || — || align=right data-sort-value="0.91" | 910 m || 
|-id=526 bgcolor=#fefefe
| 412526 ||  || — || October 21, 2003 || Kitt Peak || Spacewatch || — || align=right | 1.0 km || 
|-id=527 bgcolor=#E9E9E9
| 412527 ||  || — || April 20, 2009 || Mount Lemmon || Mount Lemmon Survey || — || align=right data-sort-value="0.92" | 920 m || 
|-id=528 bgcolor=#fefefe
| 412528 ||  || — || April 30, 2003 || Kitt Peak || Spacewatch || — || align=right | 1.1 km || 
|-id=529 bgcolor=#d6d6d6
| 412529 ||  || — || September 13, 2004 || Kitt Peak || Spacewatch || KOR || align=right | 1.7 km || 
|-id=530 bgcolor=#fefefe
| 412530 ||  || — || August 9, 2007 || Kitt Peak || Spacewatch || — || align=right data-sort-value="0.74" | 740 m || 
|-id=531 bgcolor=#fefefe
| 412531 ||  || — || March 13, 2010 || Mount Lemmon || Mount Lemmon Survey || — || align=right | 1.9 km || 
|-id=532 bgcolor=#fefefe
| 412532 ||  || — || November 24, 1995 || Kitt Peak || Spacewatch || V || align=right data-sort-value="0.80" | 800 m || 
|-id=533 bgcolor=#d6d6d6
| 412533 ||  || — || September 18, 2003 || Kitt Peak || Spacewatch || — || align=right | 3.7 km || 
|-id=534 bgcolor=#fefefe
| 412534 ||  || — || October 7, 2004 || Kitt Peak || Spacewatch || — || align=right data-sort-value="0.70" | 700 m || 
|-id=535 bgcolor=#E9E9E9
| 412535 ||  || — || February 24, 2009 || Catalina || CSS || — || align=right | 1.7 km || 
|-id=536 bgcolor=#E9E9E9
| 412536 ||  || — || November 15, 2006 || Mount Lemmon || Mount Lemmon Survey || — || align=right | 2.2 km || 
|-id=537 bgcolor=#E9E9E9
| 412537 ||  || — || October 16, 2006 || Kitt Peak || Spacewatch || — || align=right | 1.7 km || 
|-id=538 bgcolor=#d6d6d6
| 412538 ||  || — || February 25, 2006 || Mount Lemmon || Mount Lemmon Survey || LUT || align=right | 5.0 km || 
|-id=539 bgcolor=#fefefe
| 412539 ||  || — || October 25, 2008 || Mount Lemmon || Mount Lemmon Survey || — || align=right data-sort-value="0.61" | 610 m || 
|-id=540 bgcolor=#d6d6d6
| 412540 ||  || — || February 23, 2007 || Kitt Peak || Spacewatch || TIR || align=right | 2.5 km || 
|-id=541 bgcolor=#d6d6d6
| 412541 ||  || — || December 2, 2005 || Kitt Peak || Spacewatch || — || align=right | 3.8 km || 
|-id=542 bgcolor=#d6d6d6
| 412542 ||  || — || February 7, 1995 || Kitt Peak || Spacewatch || VER || align=right | 2.9 km || 
|-id=543 bgcolor=#E9E9E9
| 412543 ||  || — || October 21, 2006 || Catalina || CSS || — || align=right | 1.8 km || 
|-id=544 bgcolor=#d6d6d6
| 412544 ||  || — || September 15, 2009 || Kitt Peak || Spacewatch || — || align=right | 2.8 km || 
|-id=545 bgcolor=#fefefe
| 412545 ||  || — || September 11, 2004 || Kitt Peak || Spacewatch || V || align=right data-sort-value="0.60" | 600 m || 
|-id=546 bgcolor=#fefefe
| 412546 ||  || — || August 23, 2007 || Kitt Peak || Spacewatch || — || align=right data-sort-value="0.75" | 750 m || 
|-id=547 bgcolor=#fefefe
| 412547 ||  || — || November 19, 2008 || Kitt Peak || Spacewatch || V || align=right data-sort-value="0.73" | 730 m || 
|-id=548 bgcolor=#E9E9E9
| 412548 ||  || — || April 24, 2001 || Kitt Peak || Spacewatch || — || align=right | 3.0 km || 
|-id=549 bgcolor=#fefefe
| 412549 ||  || — || October 4, 2004 || Kitt Peak || Spacewatch || V || align=right data-sort-value="0.63" | 630 m || 
|-id=550 bgcolor=#FA8072
| 412550 ||  || — || April 21, 1998 || Socorro || LINEAR || — || align=right data-sort-value="0.92" | 920 m || 
|-id=551 bgcolor=#d6d6d6
| 412551 ||  || — || January 9, 2006 || Kitt Peak || Spacewatch || — || align=right | 3.6 km || 
|-id=552 bgcolor=#E9E9E9
| 412552 ||  || — || March 31, 2009 || Mount Lemmon || Mount Lemmon Survey || — || align=right | 2.6 km || 
|-id=553 bgcolor=#fefefe
| 412553 ||  || — || September 13, 2007 || Mount Lemmon || Mount Lemmon Survey || V || align=right data-sort-value="0.61" | 610 m || 
|-id=554 bgcolor=#fefefe
| 412554 ||  || — || February 5, 2006 || Mount Lemmon || Mount Lemmon Survey || (2076) || align=right data-sort-value="0.79" | 790 m || 
|-id=555 bgcolor=#E9E9E9
| 412555 ||  || — || May 18, 2004 || Socorro || LINEAR || — || align=right | 2.6 km || 
|-id=556 bgcolor=#d6d6d6
| 412556 ||  || — || January 13, 2010 || WISE || WISE || LUT || align=right | 6.0 km || 
|-id=557 bgcolor=#d6d6d6
| 412557 ||  || — || December 15, 2004 || Kitt Peak || Spacewatch || — || align=right | 3.7 km || 
|-id=558 bgcolor=#d6d6d6
| 412558 ||  || — || September 18, 2009 || Catalina || CSS || ELF || align=right | 5.4 km || 
|-id=559 bgcolor=#fefefe
| 412559 ||  || — || December 21, 2008 || Mount Lemmon || Mount Lemmon Survey || — || align=right data-sort-value="0.87" | 870 m || 
|-id=560 bgcolor=#d6d6d6
| 412560 ||  || — || November 4, 2004 || Kitt Peak || Spacewatch || EOS || align=right | 2.2 km || 
|-id=561 bgcolor=#fefefe
| 412561 ||  || — || November 7, 2008 || Mount Lemmon || Mount Lemmon Survey || — || align=right data-sort-value="0.98" | 980 m || 
|-id=562 bgcolor=#fefefe
| 412562 ||  || — || November 5, 2007 || Mount Lemmon || Mount Lemmon Survey || — || align=right data-sort-value="0.97" | 970 m || 
|-id=563 bgcolor=#E9E9E9
| 412563 ||  || — || January 18, 2008 || Mount Lemmon || Mount Lemmon Survey || — || align=right | 2.3 km || 
|-id=564 bgcolor=#E9E9E9
| 412564 ||  || — || January 11, 2008 || Kitt Peak || Spacewatch || EUN || align=right | 1.4 km || 
|-id=565 bgcolor=#d6d6d6
| 412565 ||  || — || January 7, 2006 || Kitt Peak || Spacewatch || — || align=right | 3.3 km || 
|-id=566 bgcolor=#fefefe
| 412566 ||  || — || April 22, 2007 || Kitt Peak || Spacewatch || — || align=right data-sort-value="0.67" | 670 m || 
|-id=567 bgcolor=#d6d6d6
| 412567 ||  || — || August 22, 2003 || Socorro || LINEAR || TIR || align=right | 3.8 km || 
|-id=568 bgcolor=#fefefe
| 412568 ||  || — || October 10, 2007 || Catalina || CSS || V || align=right data-sort-value="0.84" | 840 m || 
|-id=569 bgcolor=#fefefe
| 412569 ||  || — || January 31, 2009 || Mount Lemmon || Mount Lemmon Survey || V || align=right | 1.0 km || 
|-id=570 bgcolor=#fefefe
| 412570 ||  || — || January 20, 2010 || WISE || WISE || — || align=right | 2.0 km || 
|-id=571 bgcolor=#d6d6d6
| 412571 ||  || — || January 7, 2006 || Mount Lemmon || Mount Lemmon Survey || — || align=right | 3.1 km || 
|-id=572 bgcolor=#fefefe
| 412572 ||  || — || December 16, 2004 || Kitt Peak || Spacewatch || — || align=right data-sort-value="0.81" | 810 m || 
|-id=573 bgcolor=#fefefe
| 412573 ||  || — || October 23, 2003 || Anderson Mesa || LONEOS || — || align=right | 1.2 km || 
|-id=574 bgcolor=#fefefe
| 412574 ||  || — || February 8, 2002 || Kitt Peak || Spacewatch || — || align=right | 1.0 km || 
|-id=575 bgcolor=#FA8072
| 412575 ||  || — || August 27, 2006 || Kitt Peak || Spacewatch || — || align=right | 2.7 km || 
|-id=576 bgcolor=#E9E9E9
| 412576 ||  || — || February 7, 2008 || Mount Lemmon || Mount Lemmon Survey || AGN || align=right | 1.0 km || 
|-id=577 bgcolor=#fefefe
| 412577 ||  || — || September 9, 2007 || Anderson Mesa || LONEOS || V || align=right data-sort-value="0.64" | 640 m || 
|-id=578 bgcolor=#d6d6d6
| 412578 ||  || — || December 28, 2005 || Kitt Peak || Spacewatch || — || align=right | 2.6 km || 
|-id=579 bgcolor=#fefefe
| 412579 ||  || — || September 12, 2007 || Mount Lemmon || Mount Lemmon Survey || MAS || align=right data-sort-value="0.58" | 580 m || 
|-id=580 bgcolor=#d6d6d6
| 412580 ||  || — || October 30, 2005 || Kitt Peak || Spacewatch || — || align=right | 2.6 km || 
|-id=581 bgcolor=#E9E9E9
| 412581 ||  || — || December 20, 2007 || Kitt Peak || Spacewatch || — || align=right | 1.7 km || 
|-id=582 bgcolor=#fefefe
| 412582 ||  || — || March 16, 2010 || Mount Lemmon || Mount Lemmon Survey || — || align=right data-sort-value="0.78" | 780 m || 
|-id=583 bgcolor=#E9E9E9
| 412583 ||  || — || September 3, 2010 || Mount Lemmon || Mount Lemmon Survey || — || align=right data-sort-value="0.94" | 940 m || 
|-id=584 bgcolor=#fefefe
| 412584 ||  || — || January 31, 2006 || Kitt Peak || Spacewatch || — || align=right data-sort-value="0.92" | 920 m || 
|-id=585 bgcolor=#E9E9E9
| 412585 ||  || — || February 19, 2009 || Mount Lemmon || Mount Lemmon Survey || — || align=right data-sort-value="0.90" | 900 m || 
|-id=586 bgcolor=#d6d6d6
| 412586 ||  || — || December 14, 2001 || Socorro || LINEAR || — || align=right | 2.8 km || 
|-id=587 bgcolor=#E9E9E9
| 412587 ||  || — || February 3, 2000 || Kitt Peak || Spacewatch || — || align=right | 1.3 km || 
|-id=588 bgcolor=#E9E9E9
| 412588 ||  || — || August 30, 2005 || Kitt Peak || Spacewatch || — || align=right | 1.9 km || 
|-id=589 bgcolor=#d6d6d6
| 412589 ||  || — || February 21, 2007 || Mount Lemmon || Mount Lemmon Survey || — || align=right | 3.5 km || 
|-id=590 bgcolor=#fefefe
| 412590 ||  || — || February 1, 2005 || Kitt Peak || Spacewatch || — || align=right | 2.0 km || 
|-id=591 bgcolor=#fefefe
| 412591 ||  || — || March 23, 2006 || Kitt Peak || Spacewatch || NYS || align=right data-sort-value="0.64" | 640 m || 
|-id=592 bgcolor=#E9E9E9
| 412592 ||  || — || November 13, 2006 || Kitt Peak || Spacewatch || PAD || align=right | 1.7 km || 
|-id=593 bgcolor=#fefefe
| 412593 ||  || — || July 27, 2001 || Anderson Mesa || LONEOS || — || align=right data-sort-value="0.69" | 690 m || 
|-id=594 bgcolor=#d6d6d6
| 412594 ||  || — || January 23, 2006 || Kitt Peak || Spacewatch || EOS || align=right | 2.3 km || 
|-id=595 bgcolor=#d6d6d6
| 412595 ||  || — || October 15, 2004 || Mount Lemmon || Mount Lemmon Survey || — || align=right | 3.9 km || 
|-id=596 bgcolor=#E9E9E9
| 412596 ||  || — || November 19, 2006 || Kitt Peak || Spacewatch || — || align=right | 2.4 km || 
|-id=597 bgcolor=#fefefe
| 412597 ||  || — || October 10, 2001 || Kitt Peak || Spacewatch || — || align=right data-sort-value="0.66" | 660 m || 
|-id=598 bgcolor=#fefefe
| 412598 ||  || — || November 4, 2004 || Kitt Peak || Spacewatch || — || align=right data-sort-value="0.57" | 570 m || 
|-id=599 bgcolor=#E9E9E9
| 412599 ||  || — || May 10, 2005 || Kitt Peak || Spacewatch || — || align=right | 2.1 km || 
|-id=600 bgcolor=#d6d6d6
| 412600 ||  || — || September 16, 2009 || Kitt Peak || Spacewatch || — || align=right | 3.1 km || 
|}

412601–412700 

|-bgcolor=#fefefe
| 412601 ||  || — || October 9, 2004 || Kitt Peak || Spacewatch || — || align=right data-sort-value="0.62" | 620 m || 
|-id=602 bgcolor=#E9E9E9
| 412602 ||  || — || May 4, 2005 || Kitt Peak || Spacewatch || — || align=right data-sort-value="0.98" | 980 m || 
|-id=603 bgcolor=#fefefe
| 412603 ||  || — || March 3, 2006 || Mount Lemmon || Mount Lemmon Survey || — || align=right data-sort-value="0.78" | 780 m || 
|-id=604 bgcolor=#E9E9E9
| 412604 ||  || — || May 21, 2005 || Mount Lemmon || Mount Lemmon Survey || — || align=right | 2.7 km || 
|-id=605 bgcolor=#E9E9E9
| 412605 ||  || — || December 1, 2003 || Kitt Peak || Spacewatch || — || align=right data-sort-value="0.88" | 880 m || 
|-id=606 bgcolor=#d6d6d6
| 412606 ||  || — || January 7, 2006 || Kitt Peak || Spacewatch || — || align=right | 3.4 km || 
|-id=607 bgcolor=#E9E9E9
| 412607 ||  || — || June 29, 2005 || Kitt Peak || Spacewatch || — || align=right | 2.0 km || 
|-id=608 bgcolor=#E9E9E9
| 412608 ||  || — || July 24, 2010 || WISE || WISE || — || align=right | 1.6 km || 
|-id=609 bgcolor=#E9E9E9
| 412609 ||  || — || March 15, 2004 || Kitt Peak || Spacewatch || — || align=right | 1.6 km || 
|-id=610 bgcolor=#fefefe
| 412610 ||  || — || January 15, 2004 || Kitt Peak || Spacewatch || — || align=right data-sort-value="0.86" | 860 m || 
|-id=611 bgcolor=#fefefe
| 412611 ||  || — || September 20, 2003 || Kitt Peak || Spacewatch || — || align=right data-sort-value="0.90" | 900 m || 
|-id=612 bgcolor=#d6d6d6
| 412612 ||  || — || February 27, 2001 || Kitt Peak || Spacewatch || — || align=right | 2.7 km || 
|-id=613 bgcolor=#E9E9E9
| 412613 ||  || — || April 26, 2001 || Kitt Peak || Spacewatch || — || align=right | 1.0 km || 
|-id=614 bgcolor=#d6d6d6
| 412614 ||  || — || August 20, 2003 || Campo Imperatore || CINEOS || TIR || align=right | 3.0 km || 
|-id=615 bgcolor=#d6d6d6
| 412615 ||  || — || September 11, 2004 || Kitt Peak || Spacewatch || — || align=right | 2.5 km || 
|-id=616 bgcolor=#d6d6d6
| 412616 ||  || — || February 25, 2010 || WISE || WISE || EUP || align=right | 4.3 km || 
|-id=617 bgcolor=#E9E9E9
| 412617 ||  || — || February 10, 2008 || Kitt Peak || Spacewatch || (194) || align=right | 1.3 km || 
|-id=618 bgcolor=#fefefe
| 412618 ||  || — || March 16, 2010 || Mount Lemmon || Mount Lemmon Survey || — || align=right data-sort-value="0.75" | 750 m || 
|-id=619 bgcolor=#fefefe
| 412619 ||  || — || January 26, 2006 || Kitt Peak || Spacewatch || — || align=right data-sort-value="0.74" | 740 m || 
|-id=620 bgcolor=#fefefe
| 412620 ||  || — || September 18, 2003 || Kitt Peak || Spacewatch || — || align=right | 1.00 km || 
|-id=621 bgcolor=#d6d6d6
| 412621 ||  || — || July 2, 2008 || Kitt Peak || Spacewatch || — || align=right | 4.5 km || 
|-id=622 bgcolor=#d6d6d6
| 412622 ||  || — || January 31, 2006 || Kitt Peak || Spacewatch || — || align=right | 2.5 km || 
|-id=623 bgcolor=#E9E9E9
| 412623 ||  || — || June 27, 2010 || WISE || WISE || — || align=right | 1.9 km || 
|-id=624 bgcolor=#d6d6d6
| 412624 ||  || — || March 14, 2007 || Kitt Peak || Spacewatch || — || align=right | 2.8 km || 
|-id=625 bgcolor=#fefefe
| 412625 ||  || — || March 25, 2003 || Anderson Mesa || LONEOS || — || align=right data-sort-value="0.87" | 870 m || 
|-id=626 bgcolor=#E9E9E9
| 412626 ||  || — || December 21, 2003 || Kitt Peak || Spacewatch || — || align=right | 1.2 km || 
|-id=627 bgcolor=#fefefe
| 412627 ||  || — || November 9, 1999 || Kitt Peak || Spacewatch || MAS || align=right data-sort-value="0.86" | 860 m || 
|-id=628 bgcolor=#d6d6d6
| 412628 ||  || — || March 11, 2008 || Mount Lemmon || Mount Lemmon Survey || — || align=right | 2.1 km || 
|-id=629 bgcolor=#E9E9E9
| 412629 ||  || — || February 11, 2004 || Kitt Peak || Spacewatch || — || align=right | 1.8 km || 
|-id=630 bgcolor=#E9E9E9
| 412630 ||  || — || December 19, 2007 || Mount Lemmon || Mount Lemmon Survey || — || align=right | 1.6 km || 
|-id=631 bgcolor=#E9E9E9
| 412631 ||  || — || November 14, 2006 || Kitt Peak || Spacewatch || — || align=right | 1.8 km || 
|-id=632 bgcolor=#E9E9E9
| 412632 ||  || — || January 16, 2004 || Catalina || CSS || BRG || align=right | 1.5 km || 
|-id=633 bgcolor=#d6d6d6
| 412633 ||  || — || December 25, 2010 || Kitt Peak || Spacewatch || — || align=right | 3.4 km || 
|-id=634 bgcolor=#E9E9E9
| 412634 ||  || — || July 29, 2010 || WISE || WISE || — || align=right | 2.3 km || 
|-id=635 bgcolor=#E9E9E9
| 412635 ||  || — || October 23, 2006 || Catalina || CSS || — || align=right | 3.3 km || 
|-id=636 bgcolor=#E9E9E9
| 412636 ||  || — || September 26, 2006 || Kitt Peak || Spacewatch || — || align=right | 1.5 km || 
|-id=637 bgcolor=#fefefe
| 412637 ||  || — || December 23, 2003 || Socorro || LINEAR || — || align=right data-sort-value="0.87" | 870 m || 
|-id=638 bgcolor=#fefefe
| 412638 ||  || — || April 5, 2005 || Mount Lemmon || Mount Lemmon Survey || — || align=right | 1.2 km || 
|-id=639 bgcolor=#d6d6d6
| 412639 ||  || — || March 20, 2007 || Mount Lemmon || Mount Lemmon Survey || — || align=right | 2.5 km || 
|-id=640 bgcolor=#d6d6d6
| 412640 ||  || — || December 6, 2005 || Kitt Peak || Spacewatch || — || align=right | 2.5 km || 
|-id=641 bgcolor=#fefefe
| 412641 ||  || — || December 14, 2004 || Catalina || CSS || — || align=right data-sort-value="0.83" | 830 m || 
|-id=642 bgcolor=#d6d6d6
| 412642 ||  || — || January 19, 2005 || Kitt Peak || Spacewatch || 7:4 || align=right | 6.1 km || 
|-id=643 bgcolor=#d6d6d6
| 412643 ||  || — || April 14, 2007 || Catalina || CSS || — || align=right | 3.4 km || 
|-id=644 bgcolor=#E9E9E9
| 412644 ||  || — || April 21, 2009 || Mount Lemmon || Mount Lemmon Survey || — || align=right | 1.5 km || 
|-id=645 bgcolor=#d6d6d6
| 412645 ||  || — || February 1, 2006 || Kitt Peak || Spacewatch || — || align=right | 3.0 km || 
|-id=646 bgcolor=#d6d6d6
| 412646 ||  || — || September 19, 2003 || Kitt Peak || Spacewatch || — || align=right | 3.2 km || 
|-id=647 bgcolor=#fefefe
| 412647 ||  || — || December 15, 2004 || Kitt Peak || Spacewatch || — || align=right data-sort-value="0.84" | 840 m || 
|-id=648 bgcolor=#d6d6d6
| 412648 ||  || — || March 12, 2007 || Kitt Peak || Spacewatch || EOS || align=right | 1.8 km || 
|-id=649 bgcolor=#fefefe
| 412649 ||  || — || September 28, 2003 || Kitt Peak || Spacewatch || — || align=right data-sort-value="0.74" | 740 m || 
|-id=650 bgcolor=#fefefe
| 412650 ||  || — || October 20, 1995 || Kitt Peak || Spacewatch || MAS || align=right data-sort-value="0.85" | 850 m || 
|-id=651 bgcolor=#E9E9E9
| 412651 ||  || — || October 1, 2005 || Kitt Peak || Spacewatch || — || align=right | 2.3 km || 
|-id=652 bgcolor=#fefefe
| 412652 ||  || — || May 30, 2006 || Mount Lemmon || Mount Lemmon Survey || — || align=right data-sort-value="0.90" | 900 m || 
|-id=653 bgcolor=#E9E9E9
| 412653 ||  || — || September 20, 2001 || Socorro || LINEAR || — || align=right | 3.5 km || 
|-id=654 bgcolor=#d6d6d6
| 412654 ||  || — || February 20, 2006 || Kitt Peak || Spacewatch || — || align=right | 3.0 km || 
|-id=655 bgcolor=#d6d6d6
| 412655 ||  || — || October 1, 2009 || Mount Lemmon || Mount Lemmon Survey || — || align=right | 4.1 km || 
|-id=656 bgcolor=#fefefe
| 412656 ||  || — || October 23, 2003 || Kitt Peak || Spacewatch || NYS || align=right data-sort-value="0.79" | 790 m || 
|-id=657 bgcolor=#d6d6d6
| 412657 ||  || — || July 29, 2008 || Kitt Peak || Spacewatch || — || align=right | 3.0 km || 
|-id=658 bgcolor=#fefefe
| 412658 ||  || — || March 14, 2005 || Mount Lemmon || Mount Lemmon Survey || — || align=right | 1.2 km || 
|-id=659 bgcolor=#fefefe
| 412659 ||  || — || December 16, 2007 || Kitt Peak || Spacewatch || MAS || align=right data-sort-value="0.67" | 670 m || 
|-id=660 bgcolor=#E9E9E9
| 412660 ||  || — || March 31, 2008 || Mount Lemmon || Mount Lemmon Survey || — || align=right | 1.5 km || 
|-id=661 bgcolor=#fefefe
| 412661 ||  || — || October 10, 2004 || Kitt Peak || Spacewatch || — || align=right data-sort-value="0.92" | 920 m || 
|-id=662 bgcolor=#fefefe
| 412662 ||  || — || August 10, 2004 || Socorro || LINEAR || — || align=right data-sort-value="0.64" | 640 m || 
|-id=663 bgcolor=#fefefe
| 412663 ||  || — || September 16, 2003 || Kitt Peak || Spacewatch || MAS || align=right data-sort-value="0.69" | 690 m || 
|-id=664 bgcolor=#fefefe
| 412664 ||  || — || February 3, 2009 || Mount Lemmon || Mount Lemmon Survey || — || align=right | 1.0 km || 
|-id=665 bgcolor=#d6d6d6
| 412665 ||  || — || August 16, 2009 || Kitt Peak || Spacewatch || — || align=right | 2.7 km || 
|-id=666 bgcolor=#fefefe
| 412666 ||  || — || September 4, 2000 || Kitt Peak || Spacewatch || — || align=right data-sort-value="0.82" | 820 m || 
|-id=667 bgcolor=#fefefe
| 412667 ||  || — || March 8, 2005 || Mount Lemmon || Mount Lemmon Survey || — || align=right | 1.1 km || 
|-id=668 bgcolor=#d6d6d6
| 412668 ||  || — || February 13, 2010 || WISE || WISE || EUP || align=right | 5.5 km || 
|-id=669 bgcolor=#E9E9E9
| 412669 ||  || — || February 26, 1995 || Kitt Peak || Spacewatch || — || align=right | 2.2 km || 
|-id=670 bgcolor=#fefefe
| 412670 ||  || — || February 6, 1997 || Kitt Peak || Spacewatch || — || align=right | 1.3 km || 
|-id=671 bgcolor=#fefefe
| 412671 ||  || — || October 17, 2003 || Kitt Peak || Spacewatch || — || align=right data-sort-value="0.92" | 920 m || 
|-id=672 bgcolor=#d6d6d6
| 412672 ||  || — || December 24, 2005 || Kitt Peak || Spacewatch || — || align=right | 3.3 km || 
|-id=673 bgcolor=#E9E9E9
| 412673 ||  || — || December 15, 2006 || Mount Lemmon || Mount Lemmon Survey || AGN || align=right | 1.1 km || 
|-id=674 bgcolor=#d6d6d6
| 412674 ||  || — || May 9, 2007 || Mount Lemmon || Mount Lemmon Survey || — || align=right | 2.3 km || 
|-id=675 bgcolor=#d6d6d6
| 412675 ||  || — || September 24, 2009 || Kitt Peak || Spacewatch || — || align=right | 3.2 km || 
|-id=676 bgcolor=#fefefe
| 412676 ||  || — || September 11, 2007 || Mount Lemmon || Mount Lemmon Survey || — || align=right data-sort-value="0.74" | 740 m || 
|-id=677 bgcolor=#fefefe
| 412677 ||  || — || July 7, 2003 || Kitt Peak || Spacewatch || — || align=right data-sort-value="0.86" | 860 m || 
|-id=678 bgcolor=#d6d6d6
| 412678 ||  || — || January 8, 2000 || Kitt Peak || Spacewatch || TIR || align=right | 3.7 km || 
|-id=679 bgcolor=#d6d6d6
| 412679 ||  || — || November 2, 2010 || Kitt Peak || Spacewatch || VER || align=right | 3.4 km || 
|-id=680 bgcolor=#d6d6d6
| 412680 ||  || — || December 2, 2010 || Mount Lemmon || Mount Lemmon Survey || EOS || align=right | 1.8 km || 
|-id=681 bgcolor=#E9E9E9
| 412681 ||  || — || April 19, 2004 || Kitt Peak || Spacewatch || — || align=right | 2.3 km || 
|-id=682 bgcolor=#fefefe
| 412682 ||  || — || July 24, 1995 || Kitt Peak || Spacewatch || NYS || align=right data-sort-value="0.81" | 810 m || 
|-id=683 bgcolor=#d6d6d6
| 412683 ||  || — || September 16, 2003 || Kitt Peak || Spacewatch || — || align=right | 2.4 km || 
|-id=684 bgcolor=#d6d6d6
| 412684 ||  || — || November 6, 2009 || Catalina || CSS || EOS || align=right | 2.6 km || 
|-id=685 bgcolor=#d6d6d6
| 412685 ||  || — || April 24, 2007 || Mount Lemmon || Mount Lemmon Survey || — || align=right | 2.7 km || 
|-id=686 bgcolor=#E9E9E9
| 412686 ||  || — || September 5, 2010 || Mount Lemmon || Mount Lemmon Survey || — || align=right data-sort-value="0.94" | 940 m || 
|-id=687 bgcolor=#fefefe
| 412687 ||  || — || August 13, 2007 || XuYi || PMO NEO || — || align=right data-sort-value="0.78" | 780 m || 
|-id=688 bgcolor=#fefefe
| 412688 ||  || — || September 13, 2007 || Mount Lemmon || Mount Lemmon Survey || — || align=right data-sort-value="0.61" | 610 m || 
|-id=689 bgcolor=#d6d6d6
| 412689 ||  || — || August 30, 2003 || Kitt Peak || Spacewatch || — || align=right | 3.9 km || 
|-id=690 bgcolor=#d6d6d6
| 412690 ||  || — || October 6, 2004 || Kitt Peak || Spacewatch || — || align=right | 2.1 km || 
|-id=691 bgcolor=#E9E9E9
| 412691 ||  || — || February 7, 2008 || Kitt Peak || Spacewatch || — || align=right | 2.0 km || 
|-id=692 bgcolor=#E9E9E9
| 412692 ||  || — || July 18, 2006 || Siding Spring || SSS || — || align=right | 1.3 km || 
|-id=693 bgcolor=#E9E9E9
| 412693 ||  || — || March 15, 2004 || Kitt Peak || Spacewatch || — || align=right | 2.1 km || 
|-id=694 bgcolor=#E9E9E9
| 412694 ||  || — || December 19, 2003 || Kitt Peak || Spacewatch || EUN || align=right | 1.3 km || 
|-id=695 bgcolor=#d6d6d6
| 412695 ||  || — || December 30, 2005 || Kitt Peak || Spacewatch || — || align=right | 3.4 km || 
|-id=696 bgcolor=#E9E9E9
| 412696 ||  || — || April 6, 2005 || Catalina || CSS || RAF || align=right | 1.0 km || 
|-id=697 bgcolor=#d6d6d6
| 412697 ||  || — || August 31, 2003 || Kitt Peak || Spacewatch || — || align=right | 3.5 km || 
|-id=698 bgcolor=#fefefe
| 412698 ||  || — || January 20, 2002 || Kitt Peak || Spacewatch || — || align=right | 1.0 km || 
|-id=699 bgcolor=#fefefe
| 412699 ||  || — || October 10, 1999 || Kitt Peak || Spacewatch || NYS || align=right data-sort-value="0.72" | 720 m || 
|-id=700 bgcolor=#E9E9E9
| 412700 ||  || — || July 2, 2005 || Kitt Peak || Spacewatch || — || align=right | 1.3 km || 
|}

412701–412800 

|-bgcolor=#d6d6d6
| 412701 ||  || — || November 10, 2004 || Kitt Peak || Spacewatch || — || align=right | 2.7 km || 
|-id=702 bgcolor=#d6d6d6
| 412702 ||  || — || September 8, 2004 || Socorro || LINEAR || — || align=right | 2.6 km || 
|-id=703 bgcolor=#fefefe
| 412703 ||  || — || April 26, 1993 || Kitt Peak || Spacewatch || — || align=right data-sort-value="0.80" | 800 m || 
|-id=704 bgcolor=#E9E9E9
| 412704 ||  || — || December 10, 2006 || Kitt Peak || Spacewatch || MRX || align=right | 1.0 km || 
|-id=705 bgcolor=#d6d6d6
| 412705 ||  || — || February 2, 2006 || Kitt Peak || Spacewatch || — || align=right | 4.1 km || 
|-id=706 bgcolor=#fefefe
| 412706 ||  || — || February 25, 2006 || Kitt Peak || Spacewatch || — || align=right data-sort-value="0.79" | 790 m || 
|-id=707 bgcolor=#E9E9E9
| 412707 ||  || — || September 28, 2000 || Kitt Peak || Spacewatch || — || align=right | 2.3 km || 
|-id=708 bgcolor=#FA8072
| 412708 ||  || — || March 13, 2007 || Mount Lemmon || Mount Lemmon Survey || — || align=right data-sort-value="0.58" | 580 m || 
|-id=709 bgcolor=#E9E9E9
| 412709 ||  || — || October 20, 2006 || Mount Lemmon || Mount Lemmon Survey || — || align=right | 1.3 km || 
|-id=710 bgcolor=#d6d6d6
| 412710 ||  || — || March 26, 2010 || WISE || WISE || 7:4 || align=right | 3.4 km || 
|-id=711 bgcolor=#fefefe
| 412711 ||  || — || December 29, 2003 || Kitt Peak || Spacewatch || — || align=right data-sort-value="0.89" | 890 m || 
|-id=712 bgcolor=#E9E9E9
| 412712 ||  || — || March 7, 2008 || Kitt Peak || Spacewatch || — || align=right | 1.4 km || 
|-id=713 bgcolor=#E9E9E9
| 412713 ||  || — || September 7, 2000 || Kitt Peak || Spacewatch || — || align=right | 3.0 km || 
|-id=714 bgcolor=#E9E9E9
| 412714 ||  || — || August 30, 2005 || Anderson Mesa || LONEOS || — || align=right | 2.0 km || 
|-id=715 bgcolor=#fefefe
| 412715 ||  || — || November 18, 2007 || Mount Lemmon || Mount Lemmon Survey || — || align=right data-sort-value="0.83" | 830 m || 
|-id=716 bgcolor=#E9E9E9
| 412716 ||  || — || July 11, 2005 || Kitt Peak || Spacewatch || — || align=right | 1.4 km || 
|-id=717 bgcolor=#fefefe
| 412717 ||  || — || September 5, 2007 || Catalina || CSS || — || align=right | 1.2 km || 
|-id=718 bgcolor=#fefefe
| 412718 ||  || — || March 15, 2010 || Mount Lemmon || Mount Lemmon Survey || — || align=right data-sort-value="0.71" | 710 m || 
|-id=719 bgcolor=#E9E9E9
| 412719 ||  || — || September 17, 2006 || Catalina || CSS || MAR || align=right | 1.4 km || 
|-id=720 bgcolor=#d6d6d6
| 412720 ||  || — || April 10, 2013 || Mount Lemmon || Mount Lemmon Survey || — || align=right | 3.9 km || 
|-id=721 bgcolor=#d6d6d6
| 412721 ||  || — || December 14, 2010 || Mount Lemmon || Mount Lemmon Survey || — || align=right | 3.9 km || 
|-id=722 bgcolor=#d6d6d6
| 412722 ||  || — || March 9, 2007 || Catalina || CSS || BRA || align=right | 2.1 km || 
|-id=723 bgcolor=#fefefe
| 412723 ||  || — || March 3, 2006 || Kitt Peak || Spacewatch || — || align=right data-sort-value="0.66" | 660 m || 
|-id=724 bgcolor=#fefefe
| 412724 ||  || — || March 24, 2006 || Mount Lemmon || Mount Lemmon Survey || — || align=right data-sort-value="0.75" | 750 m || 
|-id=725 bgcolor=#fefefe
| 412725 ||  || — || December 22, 2003 || Kitt Peak || Spacewatch || — || align=right data-sort-value="0.86" | 860 m || 
|-id=726 bgcolor=#fefefe
| 412726 ||  || — || September 4, 2000 || Kitt Peak || Spacewatch || — || align=right | 1.00 km || 
|-id=727 bgcolor=#d6d6d6
| 412727 ||  || — || January 16, 2011 || Mount Lemmon || Mount Lemmon Survey || — || align=right | 3.1 km || 
|-id=728 bgcolor=#d6d6d6
| 412728 ||  || — || December 20, 2004 || Mount Lemmon || Mount Lemmon Survey || EUP || align=right | 4.1 km || 
|-id=729 bgcolor=#fefefe
| 412729 ||  || — || January 19, 2010 || WISE || WISE || PHO || align=right | 2.9 km || 
|-id=730 bgcolor=#E9E9E9
| 412730 ||  || — || October 23, 2006 || Kitt Peak || Spacewatch || — || align=right | 2.4 km || 
|-id=731 bgcolor=#fefefe
| 412731 ||  || — || January 18, 1998 || Kitt Peak || Spacewatch || — || align=right data-sort-value="0.76" | 760 m || 
|-id=732 bgcolor=#E9E9E9
| 412732 ||  || — || March 10, 2005 || Mount Lemmon || Mount Lemmon Survey || (5) || align=right data-sort-value="0.81" | 810 m || 
|-id=733 bgcolor=#fefefe
| 412733 ||  || — || February 19, 2009 || Kitt Peak || Spacewatch || — || align=right | 1.0 km || 
|-id=734 bgcolor=#E9E9E9
| 412734 ||  || — || January 31, 2008 || Mount Lemmon || Mount Lemmon Survey || — || align=right | 1.7 km || 
|-id=735 bgcolor=#fefefe
| 412735 ||  || — || October 1, 2003 || Kitt Peak || Spacewatch || NYS || align=right data-sort-value="0.52" | 520 m || 
|-id=736 bgcolor=#E9E9E9
| 412736 ||  || — || August 29, 2006 || Kitt Peak || Spacewatch || EUN || align=right | 1.0 km || 
|-id=737 bgcolor=#E9E9E9
| 412737 ||  || — || July 12, 2005 || Mount Lemmon || Mount Lemmon Survey || — || align=right | 3.6 km || 
|-id=738 bgcolor=#E9E9E9
| 412738 ||  || — || September 15, 2006 || Kitt Peak || Spacewatch || — || align=right data-sort-value="0.86" | 860 m || 
|-id=739 bgcolor=#E9E9E9
| 412739 ||  || — || March 17, 2004 || Kitt Peak || Spacewatch || — || align=right | 1.8 km || 
|-id=740 bgcolor=#fefefe
| 412740 ||  || — || February 4, 2009 || Mount Lemmon || Mount Lemmon Survey || — || align=right data-sort-value="0.81" | 810 m || 
|-id=741 bgcolor=#d6d6d6
| 412741 ||  || — || January 21, 2010 || WISE || WISE || — || align=right | 5.0 km || 
|-id=742 bgcolor=#E9E9E9
| 412742 ||  || — || October 8, 2010 || Kitt Peak || Spacewatch || — || align=right | 1.9 km || 
|-id=743 bgcolor=#d6d6d6
| 412743 ||  || — || August 29, 2009 || Kitt Peak || Spacewatch || — || align=right | 2.7 km || 
|-id=744 bgcolor=#E9E9E9
| 412744 ||  || — || January 13, 2004 || Kitt Peak || Spacewatch || — || align=right data-sort-value="0.94" | 940 m || 
|-id=745 bgcolor=#fefefe
| 412745 ||  || — || January 31, 2006 || Kitt Peak || Spacewatch || — || align=right data-sort-value="0.79" | 790 m || 
|-id=746 bgcolor=#d6d6d6
| 412746 ||  || — || January 28, 2007 || Mount Lemmon || Mount Lemmon Survey || — || align=right | 2.3 km || 
|-id=747 bgcolor=#fefefe
| 412747 ||  || — || March 14, 2007 || Kitt Peak || Spacewatch || — || align=right data-sort-value="0.71" | 710 m || 
|-id=748 bgcolor=#fefefe
| 412748 ||  || — || February 22, 2009 || Mount Lemmon || Mount Lemmon Survey || — || align=right data-sort-value="0.94" | 940 m || 
|-id=749 bgcolor=#E9E9E9
| 412749 ||  || — || January 10, 2008 || Kitt Peak || Spacewatch || — || align=right | 1.5 km || 
|-id=750 bgcolor=#d6d6d6
| 412750 ||  || — || December 3, 2010 || Mount Lemmon || Mount Lemmon Survey || — || align=right | 2.3 km || 
|-id=751 bgcolor=#d6d6d6
| 412751 ||  || — || November 22, 2005 || Kitt Peak || Spacewatch || — || align=right | 2.1 km || 
|-id=752 bgcolor=#fefefe
| 412752 ||  || — || November 19, 1996 || Kitt Peak || Spacewatch || — || align=right data-sort-value="0.86" | 860 m || 
|-id=753 bgcolor=#d6d6d6
| 412753 ||  || — || January 7, 2006 || Kitt Peak || Spacewatch || HYG || align=right | 3.2 km || 
|-id=754 bgcolor=#E9E9E9
| 412754 ||  || — || September 17, 2006 || Catalina || CSS || EUN || align=right | 1.4 km || 
|-id=755 bgcolor=#d6d6d6
| 412755 ||  || — || February 4, 2006 || Kitt Peak || Spacewatch || — || align=right | 2.9 km || 
|-id=756 bgcolor=#fefefe
| 412756 ||  || — || February 5, 1995 || Kitt Peak || Spacewatch || V || align=right data-sort-value="0.66" | 660 m || 
|-id=757 bgcolor=#fefefe
| 412757 ||  || — || September 15, 2007 || Kitt Peak || Spacewatch || NYS || align=right data-sort-value="0.75" | 750 m || 
|-id=758 bgcolor=#d6d6d6
| 412758 ||  || — || September 7, 2004 || Kitt Peak || Spacewatch || — || align=right | 2.6 km || 
|-id=759 bgcolor=#E9E9E9
| 412759 ||  || — || July 8, 2010 || WISE || WISE || — || align=right | 2.1 km || 
|-id=760 bgcolor=#d6d6d6
| 412760 ||  || — || February 27, 2006 || Mount Lemmon || Mount Lemmon Survey || — || align=right | 3.0 km || 
|-id=761 bgcolor=#d6d6d6
| 412761 ||  || — || August 16, 2009 || Kitt Peak || Spacewatch || TEL || align=right | 1.6 km || 
|-id=762 bgcolor=#d6d6d6
| 412762 ||  || — || October 22, 2005 || Kitt Peak || Spacewatch || KOR || align=right | 1.3 km || 
|-id=763 bgcolor=#fefefe
| 412763 ||  || — || March 9, 2006 || Catalina || CSS || — || align=right | 1.2 km || 
|-id=764 bgcolor=#d6d6d6
| 412764 ||  || — || February 19, 2012 || Kitt Peak || Spacewatch || EOS || align=right | 2.2 km || 
|-id=765 bgcolor=#fefefe
| 412765 ||  || — || December 1, 2005 || Kitt Peak || Spacewatch || — || align=right | 1.0 km || 
|-id=766 bgcolor=#fefefe
| 412766 ||  || — || September 26, 2008 || Kitt Peak || Spacewatch || — || align=right data-sort-value="0.54" | 540 m || 
|-id=767 bgcolor=#d6d6d6
| 412767 ||  || — || November 10, 1999 || Kitt Peak || Spacewatch || — || align=right | 2.4 km || 
|-id=768 bgcolor=#d6d6d6
| 412768 ||  || — || March 12, 2007 || Catalina || CSS || EOS || align=right | 1.8 km || 
|-id=769 bgcolor=#d6d6d6
| 412769 ||  || — || September 25, 2009 || Catalina || CSS || — || align=right | 3.2 km || 
|-id=770 bgcolor=#d6d6d6
| 412770 ||  || — || August 22, 2004 || Kitt Peak || Spacewatch || — || align=right | 2.8 km || 
|-id=771 bgcolor=#d6d6d6
| 412771 ||  || — || September 15, 2004 || Kitt Peak || Spacewatch || — || align=right | 3.0 km || 
|-id=772 bgcolor=#E9E9E9
| 412772 ||  || — || August 31, 2005 || Kitt Peak || Spacewatch || AGN || align=right | 1.1 km || 
|-id=773 bgcolor=#fefefe
| 412773 ||  || — || January 28, 2006 || Kitt Peak || Spacewatch || — || align=right data-sort-value="0.77" | 770 m || 
|-id=774 bgcolor=#fefefe
| 412774 ||  || — || March 4, 2005 || Mount Lemmon || Mount Lemmon Survey || — || align=right data-sort-value="0.82" | 820 m || 
|-id=775 bgcolor=#E9E9E9
| 412775 ||  || — || September 12, 1994 || Kitt Peak || Spacewatch || — || align=right data-sort-value="0.98" | 980 m || 
|-id=776 bgcolor=#fefefe
| 412776 ||  || — || October 7, 1999 || Socorro || LINEAR || NYS || align=right data-sort-value="0.87" | 870 m || 
|-id=777 bgcolor=#fefefe
| 412777 ||  || — || October 13, 2007 || Catalina || CSS || — || align=right data-sort-value="0.86" | 860 m || 
|-id=778 bgcolor=#fefefe
| 412778 ||  || — || June 22, 2007 || Kitt Peak || Spacewatch || V || align=right data-sort-value="0.67" | 670 m || 
|-id=779 bgcolor=#d6d6d6
| 412779 ||  || — || March 29, 2008 || Kitt Peak || Spacewatch || — || align=right | 2.0 km || 
|-id=780 bgcolor=#E9E9E9
| 412780 ||  || — || February 12, 2004 || Kitt Peak || Spacewatch || MAR || align=right | 1.2 km || 
|-id=781 bgcolor=#d6d6d6
| 412781 ||  || — || January 9, 2006 || Kitt Peak || Spacewatch || VER || align=right | 2.9 km || 
|-id=782 bgcolor=#d6d6d6
| 412782 ||  || — || May 27, 2008 || Kitt Peak || Spacewatch || TEL || align=right | 1.5 km || 
|-id=783 bgcolor=#E9E9E9
| 412783 ||  || — || October 1, 1998 || Kitt Peak || Spacewatch || — || align=right | 1.1 km || 
|-id=784 bgcolor=#E9E9E9
| 412784 ||  || — || January 19, 2012 || Kitt Peak || Spacewatch || ADE || align=right | 2.0 km || 
|-id=785 bgcolor=#d6d6d6
| 412785 ||  || — || October 30, 2005 || Mount Lemmon || Mount Lemmon Survey || KOR || align=right | 1.4 km || 
|-id=786 bgcolor=#d6d6d6
| 412786 ||  || — || February 22, 2007 || Kitt Peak || Spacewatch || EOS || align=right | 1.8 km || 
|-id=787 bgcolor=#d6d6d6
| 412787 ||  || — || November 1, 2005 || Mount Lemmon || Mount Lemmon Survey || — || align=right | 2.2 km || 
|-id=788 bgcolor=#d6d6d6
| 412788 ||  || — || March 26, 1993 || Kitt Peak || Spacewatch || — || align=right | 2.8 km || 
|-id=789 bgcolor=#E9E9E9
| 412789 ||  || — || January 1, 2008 || Mount Lemmon || Mount Lemmon Survey || (5) || align=right data-sort-value="0.95" | 950 m || 
|-id=790 bgcolor=#fefefe
| 412790 ||  || — || February 24, 2006 || Kitt Peak || Spacewatch || — || align=right data-sort-value="0.71" | 710 m || 
|-id=791 bgcolor=#E9E9E9
| 412791 ||  || — || September 14, 2005 || Kitt Peak || Spacewatch || — || align=right | 2.3 km || 
|-id=792 bgcolor=#E9E9E9
| 412792 ||  || — || May 3, 2005 || Kitt Peak || Spacewatch || — || align=right | 1.1 km || 
|-id=793 bgcolor=#E9E9E9
| 412793 ||  || — || October 16, 2006 || Catalina || CSS || (5) || align=right data-sort-value="0.89" | 890 m || 
|-id=794 bgcolor=#d6d6d6
| 412794 ||  || — || August 8, 2004 || Anderson Mesa || LONEOS || — || align=right | 3.3 km || 
|-id=795 bgcolor=#fefefe
| 412795 ||  || — || October 18, 2003 || Kitt Peak || Spacewatch || — || align=right data-sort-value="0.71" | 710 m || 
|-id=796 bgcolor=#E9E9E9
| 412796 ||  || — || September 1, 2005 || Kitt Peak || Spacewatch || AGN || align=right | 1.1 km || 
|-id=797 bgcolor=#E9E9E9
| 412797 ||  || — || April 10, 2005 || Kitt Peak || Spacewatch || — || align=right data-sort-value="0.79" | 790 m || 
|-id=798 bgcolor=#d6d6d6
| 412798 ||  || — || October 2, 2009 || Mount Lemmon || Mount Lemmon Survey || — || align=right | 3.1 km || 
|-id=799 bgcolor=#E9E9E9
| 412799 ||  || — || September 18, 2010 || Mount Lemmon || Mount Lemmon Survey || — || align=right | 2.0 km || 
|-id=800 bgcolor=#E9E9E9
| 412800 ||  || — || September 26, 2006 || Catalina || CSS || KON || align=right | 1.3 km || 
|}

412801–412900 

|-bgcolor=#fefefe
| 412801 ||  || — || December 12, 1999 || Kitt Peak || Spacewatch || — || align=right data-sort-value="0.88" | 880 m || 
|-id=802 bgcolor=#d6d6d6
| 412802 ||  || — || October 8, 2004 || Kitt Peak || Spacewatch || — || align=right | 2.3 km || 
|-id=803 bgcolor=#d6d6d6
| 412803 ||  || — || September 22, 2009 || Mount Lemmon || Mount Lemmon Survey || — || align=right | 2.2 km || 
|-id=804 bgcolor=#fefefe
| 412804 ||  || — || October 1, 2003 || Kitt Peak || Spacewatch || — || align=right | 1.0 km || 
|-id=805 bgcolor=#fefefe
| 412805 ||  || — || March 21, 2002 || Kitt Peak || Spacewatch || MAS || align=right data-sort-value="0.75" | 750 m || 
|-id=806 bgcolor=#d6d6d6
| 412806 ||  || — || October 16, 2009 || Catalina || CSS || LIX || align=right | 3.1 km || 
|-id=807 bgcolor=#fefefe
| 412807 ||  || — || February 24, 2006 || Kitt Peak || Spacewatch || — || align=right data-sort-value="0.73" | 730 m || 
|-id=808 bgcolor=#d6d6d6
| 412808 ||  || — || December 28, 2005 || Kitt Peak || Spacewatch || — || align=right | 2.6 km || 
|-id=809 bgcolor=#E9E9E9
| 412809 ||  || — || February 2, 2008 || Kitt Peak || Spacewatch || — || align=right | 1.0 km || 
|-id=810 bgcolor=#fefefe
| 412810 ||  || — || September 14, 2007 || Catalina || CSS || — || align=right data-sort-value="0.94" | 940 m || 
|-id=811 bgcolor=#E9E9E9
| 412811 ||  || — || February 26, 2008 || Mount Lemmon || Mount Lemmon Survey || — || align=right | 1.2 km || 
|-id=812 bgcolor=#E9E9E9
| 412812 ||  || — || March 8, 2008 || Mount Lemmon || Mount Lemmon Survey || — || align=right | 2.1 km || 
|-id=813 bgcolor=#d6d6d6
| 412813 ||  || — || September 19, 2003 || Kitt Peak || Spacewatch || — || align=right | 2.6 km || 
|-id=814 bgcolor=#E9E9E9
| 412814 ||  || — || August 28, 2005 || Kitt Peak || Spacewatch || — || align=right | 1.6 km || 
|-id=815 bgcolor=#d6d6d6
| 412815 ||  || — || January 28, 2007 || Mount Lemmon || Mount Lemmon Survey || — || align=right | 2.4 km || 
|-id=816 bgcolor=#fefefe
| 412816 ||  || — || April 26, 2007 || Mount Lemmon || Mount Lemmon Survey || — || align=right data-sort-value="0.89" | 890 m || 
|-id=817 bgcolor=#d6d6d6
| 412817 ||  || — || November 19, 2009 || Mount Lemmon || Mount Lemmon Survey || THM || align=right | 2.7 km || 
|-id=818 bgcolor=#E9E9E9
| 412818 ||  || — || February 17, 2004 || Kitt Peak || Spacewatch || — || align=right | 1.7 km || 
|-id=819 bgcolor=#d6d6d6
| 412819 ||  || — || February 25, 2007 || Mount Lemmon || Mount Lemmon Survey || — || align=right | 2.8 km || 
|-id=820 bgcolor=#d6d6d6
| 412820 ||  || — || January 28, 2006 || Mount Lemmon || Mount Lemmon Survey || — || align=right | 3.6 km || 
|-id=821 bgcolor=#d6d6d6
| 412821 ||  || — || May 1, 2003 || Kitt Peak || Spacewatch || KOR || align=right | 1.4 km || 
|-id=822 bgcolor=#fefefe
| 412822 ||  || — || September 19, 2003 || Kitt Peak || Spacewatch || — || align=right data-sort-value="0.54" | 540 m || 
|-id=823 bgcolor=#E9E9E9
| 412823 ||  || — || October 21, 2001 || Kitt Peak || Spacewatch || — || align=right | 2.0 km || 
|-id=824 bgcolor=#d6d6d6
| 412824 ||  || — || February 21, 2007 || Mount Lemmon || Mount Lemmon Survey || — || align=right | 2.4 km || 
|-id=825 bgcolor=#d6d6d6
| 412825 ||  || — || October 11, 2004 || Kitt Peak || Spacewatch || — || align=right | 3.1 km || 
|-id=826 bgcolor=#d6d6d6
| 412826 ||  || — || March 11, 2007 || Kitt Peak || Spacewatch || — || align=right | 3.0 km || 
|-id=827 bgcolor=#d6d6d6
| 412827 ||  || — || April 26, 2007 || Mount Lemmon || Mount Lemmon Survey || — || align=right | 3.6 km || 
|-id=828 bgcolor=#d6d6d6
| 412828 ||  || — || January 27, 2006 || Kitt Peak || Spacewatch || — || align=right | 3.1 km || 
|-id=829 bgcolor=#E9E9E9
| 412829 ||  || — || December 31, 1999 || Kitt Peak || Spacewatch || — || align=right data-sort-value="0.80" | 800 m || 
|-id=830 bgcolor=#E9E9E9
| 412830 ||  || — || January 4, 2003 || Kitt Peak || Spacewatch || — || align=right | 2.2 km || 
|-id=831 bgcolor=#fefefe
| 412831 ||  || — || February 17, 2007 || Kitt Peak || Spacewatch || — || align=right data-sort-value="0.45" | 450 m || 
|-id=832 bgcolor=#d6d6d6
| 412832 ||  || — || September 11, 2004 || Kitt Peak || Spacewatch || — || align=right | 2.3 km || 
|-id=833 bgcolor=#d6d6d6
| 412833 ||  || — || September 12, 1998 || Kitt Peak || Spacewatch || — || align=right | 2.5 km || 
|-id=834 bgcolor=#d6d6d6
| 412834 ||  || — || December 25, 2005 || Kitt Peak || Spacewatch || HYG || align=right | 3.1 km || 
|-id=835 bgcolor=#d6d6d6
| 412835 ||  || — || September 23, 2009 || Kitt Peak || Spacewatch || — || align=right | 3.0 km || 
|-id=836 bgcolor=#E9E9E9
| 412836 ||  || — || April 11, 2005 || Mount Lemmon || Mount Lemmon Survey || — || align=right data-sort-value="0.98" | 980 m || 
|-id=837 bgcolor=#fefefe
| 412837 ||  || — || February 14, 2010 || Mount Lemmon || Mount Lemmon Survey || — || align=right data-sort-value="0.63" | 630 m || 
|-id=838 bgcolor=#fefefe
| 412838 ||  || — || August 24, 2007 || Kitt Peak || Spacewatch || — || align=right data-sort-value="0.75" | 750 m || 
|-id=839 bgcolor=#d6d6d6
| 412839 ||  || — || September 16, 2003 || Kitt Peak || Spacewatch || — || align=right | 2.7 km || 
|-id=840 bgcolor=#d6d6d6
| 412840 ||  || — || September 27, 2009 || Mount Lemmon || Mount Lemmon Survey || EOS || align=right | 1.8 km || 
|-id=841 bgcolor=#d6d6d6
| 412841 ||  || — || December 24, 2005 || Kitt Peak || Spacewatch || — || align=right | 2.9 km || 
|-id=842 bgcolor=#fefefe
| 412842 ||  || — || February 9, 2005 || Mount Lemmon || Mount Lemmon Survey || — || align=right data-sort-value="0.96" | 960 m || 
|-id=843 bgcolor=#d6d6d6
| 412843 ||  || — || January 31, 2006 || Mount Lemmon || Mount Lemmon Survey || — || align=right | 2.8 km || 
|-id=844 bgcolor=#E9E9E9
| 412844 ||  || — || August 29, 2005 || Kitt Peak || Spacewatch || — || align=right | 1.9 km || 
|-id=845 bgcolor=#d6d6d6
| 412845 ||  || — || September 12, 2009 || Kitt Peak || Spacewatch || — || align=right | 2.3 km || 
|-id=846 bgcolor=#fefefe
| 412846 ||  || — || December 18, 2004 || Mount Lemmon || Mount Lemmon Survey || — || align=right data-sort-value="0.91" | 910 m || 
|-id=847 bgcolor=#d6d6d6
| 412847 ||  || — || March 10, 2007 || Mount Lemmon || Mount Lemmon Survey || — || align=right | 2.7 km || 
|-id=848 bgcolor=#E9E9E9
| 412848 ||  || — || February 28, 2008 || Mount Lemmon || Mount Lemmon Survey || — || align=right | 1.5 km || 
|-id=849 bgcolor=#d6d6d6
| 412849 ||  || — || September 17, 1998 || Kitt Peak || Spacewatch || THM || align=right | 1.9 km || 
|-id=850 bgcolor=#d6d6d6
| 412850 ||  || — || April 29, 2008 || Mount Lemmon || Mount Lemmon Survey || — || align=right | 2.5 km || 
|-id=851 bgcolor=#E9E9E9
| 412851 ||  || — || October 1, 2005 || Anderson Mesa || LONEOS || — || align=right | 2.7 km || 
|-id=852 bgcolor=#fefefe
| 412852 ||  || — || September 11, 2007 || Mount Lemmon || Mount Lemmon Survey || (2076) || align=right data-sort-value="0.67" | 670 m || 
|-id=853 bgcolor=#fefefe
| 412853 ||  || — || September 20, 2003 || Socorro || LINEAR || — || align=right data-sort-value="0.71" | 710 m || 
|-id=854 bgcolor=#d6d6d6
| 412854 ||  || — || October 3, 2003 || Kitt Peak || Spacewatch || — || align=right | 3.2 km || 
|-id=855 bgcolor=#fefefe
| 412855 ||  || — || June 6, 2002 || Socorro || LINEAR || — || align=right | 1.2 km || 
|-id=856 bgcolor=#E9E9E9
| 412856 ||  || — || February 16, 2009 || Kitt Peak || Spacewatch || — || align=right | 1.0 km || 
|-id=857 bgcolor=#d6d6d6
| 412857 ||  || — || October 1, 2005 || Anderson Mesa || LONEOS || — || align=right | 2.7 km || 
|-id=858 bgcolor=#fefefe
| 412858 ||  || — || January 1, 2009 || Mount Lemmon || Mount Lemmon Survey || — || align=right data-sort-value="0.98" | 980 m || 
|-id=859 bgcolor=#d6d6d6
| 412859 ||  || — || September 19, 2009 || Kitt Peak || Spacewatch || — || align=right | 2.4 km || 
|-id=860 bgcolor=#E9E9E9
| 412860 ||  || — || June 17, 2005 || Mount Lemmon || Mount Lemmon Survey || — || align=right | 2.3 km || 
|-id=861 bgcolor=#fefefe
| 412861 ||  || — || February 4, 2009 || Kitt Peak || Spacewatch || — || align=right data-sort-value="0.56" | 560 m || 
|-id=862 bgcolor=#fefefe
| 412862 ||  || — || September 16, 2003 || Kitt Peak || Spacewatch || NYS || align=right data-sort-value="0.66" | 660 m || 
|-id=863 bgcolor=#fefefe
| 412863 ||  || — || January 31, 2006 || Kitt Peak || Spacewatch || — || align=right data-sort-value="0.79" | 790 m || 
|-id=864 bgcolor=#d6d6d6
| 412864 ||  || — || September 16, 2009 || Mount Lemmon || Mount Lemmon Survey || — || align=right | 3.7 km || 
|-id=865 bgcolor=#fefefe
| 412865 ||  || — || March 26, 2006 || Mount Lemmon || Mount Lemmon Survey || NYS || align=right data-sort-value="0.65" | 650 m || 
|-id=866 bgcolor=#d6d6d6
| 412866 ||  || — || August 7, 2004 || Campo Imperatore || CINEOS || — || align=right | 3.0 km || 
|-id=867 bgcolor=#fefefe
| 412867 ||  || — || August 4, 2010 || Socorro || LINEAR || V || align=right data-sort-value="0.75" | 750 m || 
|-id=868 bgcolor=#fefefe
| 412868 ||  || — || April 25, 2006 || Kitt Peak || Spacewatch || V || align=right data-sort-value="0.68" | 680 m || 
|-id=869 bgcolor=#FA8072
| 412869 ||  || — || March 23, 2003 || Kitt Peak || Spacewatch || — || align=right data-sort-value="0.77" | 770 m || 
|-id=870 bgcolor=#fefefe
| 412870 ||  || — || October 18, 2003 || Kitt Peak || Spacewatch || — || align=right data-sort-value="0.86" | 860 m || 
|-id=871 bgcolor=#d6d6d6
| 412871 ||  || — || May 13, 1996 || Kitt Peak || Spacewatch || TIR || align=right | 4.2 km || 
|-id=872 bgcolor=#d6d6d6
| 412872 ||  || — || November 3, 2005 || Kitt Peak || Spacewatch || TRE || align=right | 3.0 km || 
|-id=873 bgcolor=#E9E9E9
| 412873 ||  || — || July 5, 2005 || Kitt Peak || Spacewatch || — || align=right | 2.0 km || 
|-id=874 bgcolor=#fefefe
| 412874 ||  || — || August 10, 2007 || Kitt Peak || Spacewatch || — || align=right | 1.4 km || 
|-id=875 bgcolor=#fefefe
| 412875 ||  || — || May 4, 2006 || Mount Lemmon || Mount Lemmon Survey || — || align=right data-sort-value="0.73" | 730 m || 
|-id=876 bgcolor=#fefefe
| 412876 ||  || — || November 2, 2007 || Mount Lemmon || Mount Lemmon Survey || V || align=right data-sort-value="0.66" | 660 m || 
|-id=877 bgcolor=#E9E9E9
| 412877 ||  || — || February 9, 2008 || Catalina || CSS || — || align=right | 2.1 km || 
|-id=878 bgcolor=#fefefe
| 412878 ||  || — || September 17, 2003 || Kitt Peak || Spacewatch || — || align=right data-sort-value="0.59" | 590 m || 
|-id=879 bgcolor=#d6d6d6
| 412879 ||  || — || October 8, 2008 || Mount Lemmon || Mount Lemmon Survey || 7:4 || align=right | 3.1 km || 
|-id=880 bgcolor=#E9E9E9
| 412880 ||  || — || December 29, 2011 || Kitt Peak || Spacewatch || GEF || align=right | 1.4 km || 
|-id=881 bgcolor=#fefefe
| 412881 ||  || — || December 28, 2005 || Kitt Peak || Spacewatch || — || align=right data-sort-value="0.84" | 840 m || 
|-id=882 bgcolor=#E9E9E9
| 412882 ||  || — || April 15, 2008 || Mount Lemmon || Mount Lemmon Survey || — || align=right | 2.0 km || 
|-id=883 bgcolor=#E9E9E9
| 412883 ||  || — || October 11, 2010 || Mount Lemmon || Mount Lemmon Survey || — || align=right | 1.4 km || 
|-id=884 bgcolor=#E9E9E9
| 412884 ||  || — || November 19, 2006 || Kitt Peak || Spacewatch || — || align=right | 1.5 km || 
|-id=885 bgcolor=#E9E9E9
| 412885 ||  || — || November 22, 2006 || Catalina || CSS || MAR || align=right | 1.1 km || 
|-id=886 bgcolor=#fefefe
| 412886 ||  || — || January 15, 2004 || Kitt Peak || Spacewatch || — || align=right | 1.1 km || 
|-id=887 bgcolor=#fefefe
| 412887 ||  || — || September 20, 2001 || Socorro || LINEAR || — || align=right data-sort-value="0.67" | 670 m || 
|-id=888 bgcolor=#fefefe
| 412888 ||  || — || October 29, 2005 || Mount Lemmon || Mount Lemmon Survey || — || align=right data-sort-value="0.51" | 510 m || 
|-id=889 bgcolor=#d6d6d6
| 412889 ||  || — || December 28, 2005 || Kitt Peak || Spacewatch || EOS || align=right | 2.4 km || 
|-id=890 bgcolor=#E9E9E9
| 412890 ||  || — || May 3, 2005 || Catalina || CSS || — || align=right | 2.7 km || 
|-id=891 bgcolor=#fefefe
| 412891 ||  || — || September 29, 2011 || Mount Lemmon || Mount Lemmon Survey || V || align=right data-sort-value="0.70" | 700 m || 
|-id=892 bgcolor=#d6d6d6
| 412892 ||  || — || September 30, 2005 || Mount Lemmon || Mount Lemmon Survey || KOR || align=right | 1.2 km || 
|-id=893 bgcolor=#fefefe
| 412893 ||  || — || September 22, 2011 || Kitt Peak || Spacewatch || — || align=right data-sort-value="0.94" | 940 m || 
|-id=894 bgcolor=#E9E9E9
| 412894 ||  || — || November 18, 2006 || Mount Lemmon || Mount Lemmon Survey || — || align=right | 2.1 km || 
|-id=895 bgcolor=#E9E9E9
| 412895 ||  || — || September 2, 2010 || Mount Lemmon || Mount Lemmon Survey || — || align=right | 1.3 km || 
|-id=896 bgcolor=#d6d6d6
| 412896 ||  || — || December 26, 2005 || Kitt Peak || Spacewatch || — || align=right | 2.9 km || 
|-id=897 bgcolor=#d6d6d6
| 412897 ||  || — || January 13, 2002 || Kitt Peak || Spacewatch || — || align=right | 2.7 km || 
|-id=898 bgcolor=#d6d6d6
| 412898 ||  || — || March 15, 2007 || Kitt Peak || Spacewatch || — || align=right | 3.2 km || 
|-id=899 bgcolor=#d6d6d6
| 412899 ||  || — || November 6, 2005 || Mount Lemmon || Mount Lemmon Survey || — || align=right | 2.6 km || 
|-id=900 bgcolor=#d6d6d6
| 412900 ||  || — || October 2, 2009 || Mount Lemmon || Mount Lemmon Survey || — || align=right | 4.3 km || 
|}

412901–413000 

|-bgcolor=#d6d6d6
| 412901 ||  || — || September 16, 2003 || Kitt Peak || Spacewatch || — || align=right | 3.5 km || 
|-id=902 bgcolor=#E9E9E9
| 412902 ||  || — || September 17, 1996 || Kitt Peak || Spacewatch || — || align=right | 2.1 km || 
|-id=903 bgcolor=#E9E9E9
| 412903 ||  || — || October 16, 2006 || Kitt Peak || Spacewatch || WIT || align=right data-sort-value="0.79" | 790 m || 
|-id=904 bgcolor=#d6d6d6
| 412904 ||  || — || March 11, 2007 || Kitt Peak || Spacewatch || — || align=right | 3.3 km || 
|-id=905 bgcolor=#E9E9E9
| 412905 ||  || — || October 4, 2006 || Mount Lemmon || Mount Lemmon Survey || — || align=right | 1.7 km || 
|-id=906 bgcolor=#fefefe
| 412906 ||  || — || January 20, 2009 || Mount Lemmon || Mount Lemmon Survey || V || align=right data-sort-value="0.77" | 770 m || 
|-id=907 bgcolor=#E9E9E9
| 412907 ||  || — || October 17, 2006 || Mount Lemmon || Mount Lemmon Survey || — || align=right | 1.7 km || 
|-id=908 bgcolor=#d6d6d6
| 412908 ||  || — || December 28, 2005 || Kitt Peak || Spacewatch || KOR || align=right | 1.2 km || 
|-id=909 bgcolor=#fefefe
| 412909 ||  || — || October 20, 1995 || Kitt Peak || Spacewatch || — || align=right | 1.1 km || 
|-id=910 bgcolor=#fefefe
| 412910 ||  || — || September 19, 1995 || Kitt Peak || Spacewatch || — || align=right | 1.0 km || 
|-id=911 bgcolor=#fefefe
| 412911 ||  || — || April 5, 2005 || Mount Lemmon || Mount Lemmon Survey || — || align=right data-sort-value="0.89" | 890 m || 
|-id=912 bgcolor=#d6d6d6
| 412912 ||  || — || January 23, 2006 || Kitt Peak || Spacewatch || — || align=right | 2.4 km || 
|-id=913 bgcolor=#fefefe
| 412913 ||  || — || October 18, 1995 || Kitt Peak || Spacewatch || — || align=right data-sort-value="0.72" | 720 m || 
|-id=914 bgcolor=#fefefe
| 412914 ||  || — || May 27, 2003 || Kitt Peak || Spacewatch || — || align=right data-sort-value="0.73" | 730 m || 
|-id=915 bgcolor=#d6d6d6
| 412915 ||  || — || February 17, 2007 || Kitt Peak || Spacewatch || — || align=right | 3.0 km || 
|-id=916 bgcolor=#fefefe
| 412916 ||  || — || December 16, 2007 || Mount Lemmon || Mount Lemmon Survey || — || align=right data-sort-value="0.89" | 890 m || 
|-id=917 bgcolor=#fefefe
| 412917 ||  || — || October 11, 2004 || Kitt Peak || Spacewatch || — || align=right data-sort-value="0.60" | 600 m || 
|-id=918 bgcolor=#fefefe
| 412918 ||  || — || October 8, 2007 || Kitt Peak || Spacewatch || — || align=right data-sort-value="0.88" | 880 m || 
|-id=919 bgcolor=#d6d6d6
| 412919 ||  || — || November 25, 2005 || Mount Lemmon || Mount Lemmon Survey || — || align=right | 3.2 km || 
|-id=920 bgcolor=#fefefe
| 412920 ||  || — || March 10, 2005 || Mount Lemmon || Mount Lemmon Survey || V || align=right data-sort-value="0.61" | 610 m || 
|-id=921 bgcolor=#d6d6d6
| 412921 ||  || — || February 21, 2007 || Mount Lemmon || Mount Lemmon Survey || — || align=right | 2.1 km || 
|-id=922 bgcolor=#fefefe
| 412922 ||  || — || March 2, 2006 || Kitt Peak || Spacewatch || — || align=right data-sort-value="0.61" | 610 m || 
|-id=923 bgcolor=#E9E9E9
| 412923 ||  || — || October 8, 2010 || Catalina || CSS || — || align=right | 1.5 km || 
|-id=924 bgcolor=#fefefe
| 412924 ||  || — || February 1, 2003 || Kitt Peak || Spacewatch || — || align=right data-sort-value="0.89" | 890 m || 
|-id=925 bgcolor=#E9E9E9
| 412925 ||  || — || May 13, 2004 || Kitt Peak || Spacewatch || — || align=right | 2.4 km || 
|-id=926 bgcolor=#E9E9E9
| 412926 ||  || — || September 5, 2010 || Mount Lemmon || Mount Lemmon Survey || — || align=right | 2.3 km || 
|-id=927 bgcolor=#d6d6d6
| 412927 ||  || — || October 8, 2004 || Anderson Mesa || LONEOS || — || align=right | 2.9 km || 
|-id=928 bgcolor=#d6d6d6
| 412928 ||  || — || December 4, 2005 || Mount Lemmon || Mount Lemmon Survey || — || align=right | 1.9 km || 
|-id=929 bgcolor=#E9E9E9
| 412929 ||  || — || October 11, 2010 || Mount Lemmon || Mount Lemmon Survey || — || align=right | 1.5 km || 
|-id=930 bgcolor=#d6d6d6
| 412930 ||  || — || November 25, 2005 || Mount Lemmon || Mount Lemmon Survey || KOR || align=right | 1.5 km || 
|-id=931 bgcolor=#d6d6d6
| 412931 ||  || — || September 16, 2003 || Kitt Peak || Spacewatch || — || align=right | 3.1 km || 
|-id=932 bgcolor=#fefefe
| 412932 ||  || — || November 9, 1993 || Kitt Peak || Spacewatch || — || align=right data-sort-value="0.70" | 700 m || 
|-id=933 bgcolor=#E9E9E9
| 412933 ||  || — || November 16, 2006 || Mount Lemmon || Mount Lemmon Survey || — || align=right | 2.5 km || 
|-id=934 bgcolor=#d6d6d6
| 412934 ||  || — || November 12, 2010 || Kitt Peak || Spacewatch || — || align=right | 2.9 km || 
|-id=935 bgcolor=#E9E9E9
| 412935 ||  || — || February 8, 2008 || Catalina || CSS || — || align=right | 1.6 km || 
|-id=936 bgcolor=#fefefe
| 412936 ||  || — || April 27, 2006 || Kitt Peak || Spacewatch || NYS || align=right data-sort-value="0.63" | 630 m || 
|-id=937 bgcolor=#d6d6d6
| 412937 ||  || — || October 11, 2004 || Kitt Peak || Spacewatch || — || align=right | 2.8 km || 
|-id=938 bgcolor=#E9E9E9
| 412938 ||  || — || November 21, 2006 || Mount Lemmon || Mount Lemmon Survey || — || align=right | 2.0 km || 
|-id=939 bgcolor=#fefefe
| 412939 ||  || — || September 30, 1999 || Kitt Peak || Spacewatch || NYS || align=right data-sort-value="0.79" | 790 m || 
|-id=940 bgcolor=#d6d6d6
| 412940 ||  || — || November 21, 2009 || Catalina || CSS || — || align=right | 3.4 km || 
|-id=941 bgcolor=#E9E9E9
| 412941 ||  || — || March 29, 2009 || Kitt Peak || Spacewatch || — || align=right | 1.4 km || 
|-id=942 bgcolor=#d6d6d6
| 412942 ||  || — || September 18, 2009 || Kitt Peak || Spacewatch || — || align=right | 2.0 km || 
|-id=943 bgcolor=#d6d6d6
| 412943 ||  || — || February 17, 2007 || Mount Lemmon || Mount Lemmon Survey || — || align=right | 2.3 km || 
|-id=944 bgcolor=#d6d6d6
| 412944 ||  || — || January 7, 2006 || Kitt Peak || Spacewatch || — || align=right | 2.4 km || 
|-id=945 bgcolor=#d6d6d6
| 412945 ||  || — || September 16, 2009 || Kitt Peak || Spacewatch || — || align=right | 2.5 km || 
|-id=946 bgcolor=#fefefe
| 412946 ||  || — || November 18, 2007 || Kitt Peak || Spacewatch || — || align=right data-sort-value="0.74" | 740 m || 
|-id=947 bgcolor=#d6d6d6
| 412947 ||  || — || February 22, 2006 || Catalina || CSS || — || align=right | 3.4 km || 
|-id=948 bgcolor=#d6d6d6
| 412948 ||  || — || December 30, 2005 || Catalina || CSS || — || align=right | 3.1 km || 
|-id=949 bgcolor=#d6d6d6
| 412949 ||  || — || March 15, 2007 || Kitt Peak || Spacewatch || — || align=right | 2.3 km || 
|-id=950 bgcolor=#d6d6d6
| 412950 ||  || — || December 25, 2005 || Kitt Peak || Spacewatch || — || align=right | 2.4 km || 
|-id=951 bgcolor=#E9E9E9
| 412951 ||  || — || April 14, 2004 || Kitt Peak || Spacewatch || — || align=right | 1.2 km || 
|-id=952 bgcolor=#d6d6d6
| 412952 ||  || — || September 24, 2008 || Mount Lemmon || Mount Lemmon Survey || 7:4 || align=right | 4.2 km || 
|-id=953 bgcolor=#d6d6d6
| 412953 ||  || — || December 8, 2005 || Kitt Peak || Spacewatch || TEL || align=right | 1.9 km || 
|-id=954 bgcolor=#d6d6d6
| 412954 ||  || — || November 10, 2004 || Kitt Peak || Spacewatch || — || align=right | 3.2 km || 
|-id=955 bgcolor=#E9E9E9
| 412955 ||  || — || October 29, 2010 || Mount Lemmon || Mount Lemmon Survey || AGN || align=right | 1.1 km || 
|-id=956 bgcolor=#fefefe
| 412956 ||  || — || October 23, 2004 || Kitt Peak || Spacewatch || V || align=right data-sort-value="0.66" | 660 m || 
|-id=957 bgcolor=#fefefe
| 412957 ||  || — || October 20, 2008 || Kitt Peak || Spacewatch || — || align=right data-sort-value="0.97" | 970 m || 
|-id=958 bgcolor=#fefefe
| 412958 ||  || — || November 26, 2003 || Kitt Peak || Spacewatch || — || align=right data-sort-value="0.88" | 880 m || 
|-id=959 bgcolor=#d6d6d6
| 412959 ||  || — || January 28, 2007 || Mount Lemmon || Mount Lemmon Survey || — || align=right | 2.9 km || 
|-id=960 bgcolor=#d6d6d6
| 412960 ||  || — || September 24, 2009 || Catalina || CSS || — || align=right | 3.3 km || 
|-id=961 bgcolor=#FA8072
| 412961 ||  || — || August 23, 2004 || Anderson Mesa || LONEOS || — || align=right data-sort-value="0.87" | 870 m || 
|-id=962 bgcolor=#E9E9E9
| 412962 ||  || — || September 18, 2006 || Kitt Peak || Spacewatch || — || align=right data-sort-value="0.97" | 970 m || 
|-id=963 bgcolor=#fefefe
| 412963 ||  || — || January 27, 2010 || WISE || WISE || — || align=right | 2.0 km || 
|-id=964 bgcolor=#d6d6d6
| 412964 ||  || — || January 26, 2006 || Kitt Peak || Spacewatch || — || align=right | 5.2 km || 
|-id=965 bgcolor=#E9E9E9
| 412965 ||  || — || March 19, 2004 || Kitt Peak || Spacewatch || MAR || align=right | 1.1 km || 
|-id=966 bgcolor=#d6d6d6
| 412966 ||  || — || November 9, 2009 || Socorro || LINEAR || — || align=right | 3.2 km || 
|-id=967 bgcolor=#fefefe
| 412967 ||  || — || December 4, 2007 || Kitt Peak || Spacewatch || MAS || align=right data-sort-value="0.87" | 870 m || 
|-id=968 bgcolor=#fefefe
| 412968 ||  || — || January 23, 2006 || Kitt Peak || Spacewatch || — || align=right data-sort-value="0.88" | 880 m || 
|-id=969 bgcolor=#E9E9E9
| 412969 ||  || — || February 28, 2008 || Kitt Peak || Spacewatch || — || align=right | 2.2 km || 
|-id=970 bgcolor=#E9E9E9
| 412970 ||  || — || June 13, 2004 || Kitt Peak || Spacewatch || — || align=right | 2.6 km || 
|-id=971 bgcolor=#fefefe
| 412971 ||  || — || May 1, 2009 || Kitt Peak || Spacewatch || — || align=right | 1.0 km || 
|-id=972 bgcolor=#d6d6d6
| 412972 ||  || — || February 27, 2006 || Kitt Peak || Spacewatch || — || align=right | 3.5 km || 
|-id=973 bgcolor=#E9E9E9
| 412973 ||  || — || September 28, 2000 || Socorro || LINEAR || — || align=right | 3.2 km || 
|-id=974 bgcolor=#d6d6d6
| 412974 || 2237 P-L || — || September 24, 1960 || Palomar || PLS || — || align=right | 2.1 km || 
|-id=975 bgcolor=#E9E9E9
| 412975 ||  || — || September 25, 1973 || Palomar || PLS || — || align=right | 2.0 km || 
|-id=976 bgcolor=#FFC2E0
| 412976 || 1987 WC || — || November 21, 1987 || Palomar || J. E. Mueller || AMO || align=right data-sort-value="0.37" | 370 m || 
|-id=977 bgcolor=#FFC2E0
| 412977 ||  || — || October 22, 1990 || Kitt Peak || Spacewatch || APO || align=right data-sort-value="0.46" | 460 m || 
|-id=978 bgcolor=#E9E9E9
| 412978 ||  || — || October 8, 1993 || Kitt Peak || Spacewatch || — || align=right | 1.1 km || 
|-id=979 bgcolor=#E9E9E9
| 412979 ||  || — || January 31, 1995 || Kitt Peak || Spacewatch || — || align=right | 1.1 km || 
|-id=980 bgcolor=#E9E9E9
| 412980 ||  || — || September 26, 1995 || Kitt Peak || Spacewatch || — || align=right | 1.9 km || 
|-id=981 bgcolor=#fefefe
| 412981 ||  || — || October 16, 1995 || Kitt Peak || Spacewatch || MAS || align=right data-sort-value="0.68" | 680 m || 
|-id=982 bgcolor=#E9E9E9
| 412982 ||  || — || October 16, 1995 || Kitt Peak || Spacewatch || — || align=right | 2.4 km || 
|-id=983 bgcolor=#FFC2E0
| 412983 ||  || — || March 24, 1996 || Siding Spring || G. J. Garradd || AMOPHA || align=right data-sort-value="0.31" | 310 m || 
|-id=984 bgcolor=#E9E9E9
| 412984 ||  || — || October 9, 1996 || Kitt Peak || Spacewatch || — || align=right | 1.8 km || 
|-id=985 bgcolor=#E9E9E9
| 412985 ||  || — || February 3, 1997 || Kitt Peak || Spacewatch || — || align=right | 2.5 km || 
|-id=986 bgcolor=#d6d6d6
| 412986 ||  || — || September 28, 1997 || Kitt Peak || Spacewatch || — || align=right | 2.9 km || 
|-id=987 bgcolor=#d6d6d6
| 412987 ||  || — || November 30, 1997 || Kitt Peak || Spacewatch || — || align=right | 3.3 km || 
|-id=988 bgcolor=#E9E9E9
| 412988 ||  || — || January 1, 1998 || Kitt Peak || Spacewatch || — || align=right | 1.7 km || 
|-id=989 bgcolor=#fefefe
| 412989 ||  || — || April 17, 1998 || Kitt Peak || Spacewatch || V || align=right data-sort-value="0.66" | 660 m || 
|-id=990 bgcolor=#fefefe
| 412990 ||  || — || April 23, 1998 || Kitt Peak || Spacewatch || — || align=right data-sort-value="0.94" | 940 m || 
|-id=991 bgcolor=#d6d6d6
| 412991 ||  || — || October 14, 1998 || Kitt Peak || Spacewatch || SHU3:2 || align=right | 5.4 km || 
|-id=992 bgcolor=#d6d6d6
| 412992 ||  || — || November 14, 1998 || Kitt Peak || Spacewatch || — || align=right | 3.3 km || 
|-id=993 bgcolor=#E9E9E9
| 412993 ||  || — || November 15, 1998 || Kitt Peak || Spacewatch || — || align=right | 1.0 km || 
|-id=994 bgcolor=#fefefe
| 412994 ||  || — || April 9, 1999 || Kitt Peak || Spacewatch || — || align=right data-sort-value="0.69" | 690 m || 
|-id=995 bgcolor=#FFC2E0
| 412995 ||  || — || June 14, 1999 || Socorro || LINEAR || AMO || align=right data-sort-value="0.35" | 350 m || 
|-id=996 bgcolor=#d6d6d6
| 412996 ||  || — || September 29, 1999 || Catalina || CSS || — || align=right | 2.3 km || 
|-id=997 bgcolor=#fefefe
| 412997 ||  || — || October 3, 1999 || Kitt Peak || Spacewatch || NYS || align=right data-sort-value="0.59" | 590 m || 
|-id=998 bgcolor=#fefefe
| 412998 ||  || — || October 13, 1999 || Kitt Peak || Spacewatch || V || align=right data-sort-value="0.70" | 700 m || 
|-id=999 bgcolor=#fefefe
| 412999 ||  || — || October 6, 1999 || Socorro || LINEAR || — || align=right data-sort-value="0.98" | 980 m || 
|-id=000 bgcolor=#fefefe
| 413000 ||  || — || October 13, 1999 || Socorro || LINEAR || NYS || align=right data-sort-value="0.67" | 670 m || 
|}

References

External links 
 Discovery Circumstances: Numbered Minor Planets (410001)–(415000) (IAU Minor Planet Center)

0412